

204001–204100 

|-bgcolor=#E9E9E9
| 204001 ||  || — || October 2, 2003 || Kitt Peak || Spacewatch || — || align=right | 2.3 km || 
|-id=002 bgcolor=#E9E9E9
| 204002 ||  || — || October 5, 2003 || Kitt Peak || Spacewatch || WIT || align=right | 1.2 km || 
|-id=003 bgcolor=#E9E9E9
| 204003 ||  || — || October 16, 2003 || Kingsnake || J. V. McClusky || — || align=right | 4.4 km || 
|-id=004 bgcolor=#d6d6d6
| 204004 ||  || — || October 18, 2003 || Socorro || LINEAR || — || align=right | 7.2 km || 
|-id=005 bgcolor=#fefefe
| 204005 ||  || — || October 17, 2003 || Anderson Mesa || LONEOS || H || align=right | 1.2 km || 
|-id=006 bgcolor=#E9E9E9
| 204006 ||  || — || October 16, 2003 || Kitt Peak || Spacewatch || — || align=right | 1.9 km || 
|-id=007 bgcolor=#E9E9E9
| 204007 ||  || — || October 16, 2003 || Kitt Peak || Spacewatch || HEN || align=right | 1.6 km || 
|-id=008 bgcolor=#E9E9E9
| 204008 ||  || — || October 20, 2003 || Kingsnake || J. V. McClusky || — || align=right | 3.8 km || 
|-id=009 bgcolor=#E9E9E9
| 204009 ||  || — || October 23, 2003 || Goodricke-Pigott || R. A. Tucker || — || align=right | 2.2 km || 
|-id=010 bgcolor=#E9E9E9
| 204010 ||  || — || October 22, 2003 || Goodricke-Pigott || R. A. Tucker || — || align=right | 2.8 km || 
|-id=011 bgcolor=#E9E9E9
| 204011 ||  || — || October 23, 2003 || Goodricke-Pigott || R. A. Tucker || — || align=right | 1.7 km || 
|-id=012 bgcolor=#E9E9E9
| 204012 ||  || — || October 16, 2003 || Palomar || NEAT || — || align=right | 2.7 km || 
|-id=013 bgcolor=#E9E9E9
| 204013 ||  || — || October 27, 2003 || Ondřejov || P. Kušnirák || PAD || align=right | 2.4 km || 
|-id=014 bgcolor=#d6d6d6
| 204014 ||  || — || October 16, 2003 || Kitt Peak || Spacewatch || — || align=right | 4.5 km || 
|-id=015 bgcolor=#E9E9E9
| 204015 ||  || — || October 16, 2003 || Kitt Peak || Spacewatch || WIT || align=right | 1.8 km || 
|-id=016 bgcolor=#E9E9E9
| 204016 ||  || — || October 17, 2003 || Kitt Peak || Spacewatch || — || align=right | 1.3 km || 
|-id=017 bgcolor=#E9E9E9
| 204017 ||  || — || October 17, 2003 || Kitt Peak || Spacewatch || — || align=right | 1.5 km || 
|-id=018 bgcolor=#E9E9E9
| 204018 ||  || — || October 18, 2003 || Palomar || NEAT || — || align=right | 3.3 km || 
|-id=019 bgcolor=#E9E9E9
| 204019 ||  || — || October 16, 2003 || Palomar || NEAT || — || align=right | 5.2 km || 
|-id=020 bgcolor=#E9E9E9
| 204020 ||  || — || October 16, 2003 || Anderson Mesa || LONEOS || — || align=right | 4.7 km || 
|-id=021 bgcolor=#E9E9E9
| 204021 ||  || — || October 16, 2003 || Anderson Mesa || LONEOS || — || align=right | 3.9 km || 
|-id=022 bgcolor=#E9E9E9
| 204022 ||  || — || October 16, 2003 || Palomar || NEAT || — || align=right | 2.4 km || 
|-id=023 bgcolor=#E9E9E9
| 204023 ||  || — || October 17, 2003 || Anderson Mesa || LONEOS || RAF || align=right | 1.6 km || 
|-id=024 bgcolor=#d6d6d6
| 204024 ||  || — || October 17, 2003 || Kitt Peak || Spacewatch || — || align=right | 5.4 km || 
|-id=025 bgcolor=#d6d6d6
| 204025 ||  || — || October 18, 2003 || Kitt Peak || Spacewatch || — || align=right | 3.2 km || 
|-id=026 bgcolor=#E9E9E9
| 204026 ||  || — || October 18, 2003 || Kitt Peak || Spacewatch || HEN || align=right | 1.5 km || 
|-id=027 bgcolor=#E9E9E9
| 204027 ||  || — || October 19, 2003 || Anderson Mesa || LONEOS || — || align=right | 3.9 km || 
|-id=028 bgcolor=#E9E9E9
| 204028 ||  || — || October 19, 2003 || Anderson Mesa || LONEOS || — || align=right | 3.1 km || 
|-id=029 bgcolor=#E9E9E9
| 204029 ||  || — || October 20, 2003 || Palomar || NEAT || — || align=right | 3.8 km || 
|-id=030 bgcolor=#E9E9E9
| 204030 ||  || — || October 20, 2003 || Palomar || NEAT || — || align=right | 1.6 km || 
|-id=031 bgcolor=#E9E9E9
| 204031 ||  || — || October 19, 2003 || Haleakala || NEAT || PAD || align=right | 4.6 km || 
|-id=032 bgcolor=#E9E9E9
| 204032 ||  || — || October 20, 2003 || Palomar || NEAT || — || align=right | 3.0 km || 
|-id=033 bgcolor=#d6d6d6
| 204033 ||  || — || October 17, 2003 || Anderson Mesa || LONEOS || — || align=right | 4.0 km || 
|-id=034 bgcolor=#E9E9E9
| 204034 ||  || — || October 19, 2003 || Palomar || NEAT || EUN || align=right | 4.6 km || 
|-id=035 bgcolor=#E9E9E9
| 204035 ||  || — || October 20, 2003 || Socorro || LINEAR || WIT || align=right | 1.6 km || 
|-id=036 bgcolor=#E9E9E9
| 204036 ||  || — || October 16, 2003 || Palomar || NEAT || GEF || align=right | 2.1 km || 
|-id=037 bgcolor=#E9E9E9
| 204037 ||  || — || October 21, 2003 || Kitt Peak || Spacewatch || GEF || align=right | 2.1 km || 
|-id=038 bgcolor=#E9E9E9
| 204038 ||  || — || October 21, 2003 || Palomar || NEAT || — || align=right | 3.7 km || 
|-id=039 bgcolor=#E9E9E9
| 204039 ||  || — || October 20, 2003 || Socorro || LINEAR || — || align=right | 2.8 km || 
|-id=040 bgcolor=#E9E9E9
| 204040 ||  || — || October 20, 2003 || Kitt Peak || Spacewatch || — || align=right | 2.1 km || 
|-id=041 bgcolor=#E9E9E9
| 204041 ||  || — || October 21, 2003 || Palomar || NEAT || — || align=right | 3.3 km || 
|-id=042 bgcolor=#E9E9E9
| 204042 ||  || — || October 19, 2003 || Kitt Peak || Spacewatch || — || align=right | 2.2 km || 
|-id=043 bgcolor=#E9E9E9
| 204043 ||  || — || October 21, 2003 || Palomar || NEAT || — || align=right | 3.1 km || 
|-id=044 bgcolor=#E9E9E9
| 204044 ||  || — || October 22, 2003 || Socorro || LINEAR || — || align=right | 4.0 km || 
|-id=045 bgcolor=#E9E9E9
| 204045 ||  || — || October 20, 2003 || Socorro || LINEAR || — || align=right | 2.0 km || 
|-id=046 bgcolor=#E9E9E9
| 204046 ||  || — || October 23, 2003 || Anderson Mesa || LONEOS || — || align=right | 3.7 km || 
|-id=047 bgcolor=#d6d6d6
| 204047 ||  || — || October 23, 2003 || Kitt Peak || Spacewatch || EOS || align=right | 2.4 km || 
|-id=048 bgcolor=#E9E9E9
| 204048 ||  || — || October 22, 2003 || Kitt Peak || Spacewatch || NEM || align=right | 2.7 km || 
|-id=049 bgcolor=#E9E9E9
| 204049 ||  || — || October 22, 2003 || Socorro || LINEAR || — || align=right | 3.9 km || 
|-id=050 bgcolor=#E9E9E9
| 204050 ||  || — || October 23, 2003 || Kitt Peak || Spacewatch || — || align=right | 2.8 km || 
|-id=051 bgcolor=#E9E9E9
| 204051 ||  || — || October 24, 2003 || Socorro || LINEAR || — || align=right | 3.6 km || 
|-id=052 bgcolor=#E9E9E9
| 204052 ||  || — || October 24, 2003 || Socorro || LINEAR || HEN || align=right | 1.7 km || 
|-id=053 bgcolor=#E9E9E9
| 204053 ||  || — || October 23, 2003 || Kitt Peak || Spacewatch || JUN || align=right | 1.4 km || 
|-id=054 bgcolor=#E9E9E9
| 204054 ||  || — || October 23, 2003 || Haleakala || NEAT || — || align=right | 1.7 km || 
|-id=055 bgcolor=#E9E9E9
| 204055 ||  || — || October 23, 2003 || Haleakala || NEAT || — || align=right | 3.6 km || 
|-id=056 bgcolor=#E9E9E9
| 204056 ||  || — || October 24, 2003 || Socorro || LINEAR || — || align=right | 3.8 km || 
|-id=057 bgcolor=#E9E9E9
| 204057 ||  || — || October 25, 2003 || Socorro || LINEAR || — || align=right | 3.4 km || 
|-id=058 bgcolor=#E9E9E9
| 204058 ||  || — || October 25, 2003 || Socorro || LINEAR || — || align=right | 3.2 km || 
|-id=059 bgcolor=#E9E9E9
| 204059 ||  || — || October 26, 2003 || Kitt Peak || Spacewatch || — || align=right | 3.9 km || 
|-id=060 bgcolor=#E9E9E9
| 204060 ||  || — || October 27, 2003 || Kitt Peak || Spacewatch || — || align=right | 2.3 km || 
|-id=061 bgcolor=#E9E9E9
| 204061 ||  || — || October 17, 2003 || Palomar || NEAT || — || align=right | 3.1 km || 
|-id=062 bgcolor=#E9E9E9
| 204062 ||  || — || October 28, 2003 || Socorro || LINEAR || — || align=right | 1.8 km || 
|-id=063 bgcolor=#E9E9E9
| 204063 ||  || — || October 25, 2003 || Socorro || LINEAR || — || align=right | 3.1 km || 
|-id=064 bgcolor=#E9E9E9
| 204064 ||  || — || October 23, 2003 || Kitt Peak || Spacewatch || MRX || align=right | 1.3 km || 
|-id=065 bgcolor=#E9E9E9
| 204065 ||  || — || October 16, 2003 || Kitt Peak || Spacewatch || HEN || align=right | 1.2 km || 
|-id=066 bgcolor=#d6d6d6
| 204066 ||  || — || October 16, 2003 || Kitt Peak || Spacewatch || — || align=right | 4.5 km || 
|-id=067 bgcolor=#E9E9E9
| 204067 ||  || — || October 16, 2003 || Palomar || NEAT || — || align=right | 2.3 km || 
|-id=068 bgcolor=#E9E9E9
| 204068 ||  || — || October 18, 2003 || Kitt Peak || Spacewatch || HEN || align=right | 1.2 km || 
|-id=069 bgcolor=#E9E9E9
| 204069 ||  || — || October 27, 2003 || Kitt Peak || Spacewatch || — || align=right | 2.5 km || 
|-id=070 bgcolor=#d6d6d6
| 204070 ||  || — || October 18, 2003 || Kitt Peak || Spacewatch || — || align=right | 2.8 km || 
|-id=071 bgcolor=#fefefe
| 204071 ||  || — || October 22, 2003 || Apache Point || SDSS || NYS || align=right data-sort-value="0.77" | 770 m || 
|-id=072 bgcolor=#E9E9E9
| 204072 ||  || — || October 22, 2003 || Apache Point || SDSS || ADE || align=right | 4.0 km || 
|-id=073 bgcolor=#E9E9E9
| 204073 ||  || — || November 15, 2003 || Kitt Peak || Spacewatch || — || align=right | 3.2 km || 
|-id=074 bgcolor=#E9E9E9
| 204074 ||  || — || November 1, 2003 || Socorro || LINEAR || — || align=right | 4.4 km || 
|-id=075 bgcolor=#d6d6d6
| 204075 || 2003 WK || — || November 16, 2003 || Catalina || CSS || KAR || align=right | 1.9 km || 
|-id=076 bgcolor=#E9E9E9
| 204076 ||  || — || November 16, 2003 || Kitt Peak || Spacewatch || — || align=right | 2.8 km || 
|-id=077 bgcolor=#E9E9E9
| 204077 ||  || — || November 16, 2003 || Kitt Peak || Spacewatch || — || align=right | 1.9 km || 
|-id=078 bgcolor=#E9E9E9
| 204078 ||  || — || November 18, 2003 || Palomar || NEAT || — || align=right | 3.2 km || 
|-id=079 bgcolor=#E9E9E9
| 204079 ||  || — || November 19, 2003 || Socorro || LINEAR || — || align=right | 3.7 km || 
|-id=080 bgcolor=#E9E9E9
| 204080 ||  || — || November 16, 2003 || Kitt Peak || Spacewatch || — || align=right | 3.1 km || 
|-id=081 bgcolor=#E9E9E9
| 204081 ||  || — || November 16, 2003 || Kitt Peak || Spacewatch || — || align=right | 2.7 km || 
|-id=082 bgcolor=#E9E9E9
| 204082 ||  || — || November 18, 2003 || Kitt Peak || Spacewatch || HOF || align=right | 3.1 km || 
|-id=083 bgcolor=#E9E9E9
| 204083 ||  || — || November 19, 2003 || Kitt Peak || Spacewatch || — || align=right | 3.3 km || 
|-id=084 bgcolor=#E9E9E9
| 204084 ||  || — || November 19, 2003 || Kitt Peak || Spacewatch || EUN || align=right | 2.0 km || 
|-id=085 bgcolor=#E9E9E9
| 204085 ||  || — || November 18, 2003 || Kitt Peak || Spacewatch || — || align=right | 3.6 km || 
|-id=086 bgcolor=#E9E9E9
| 204086 ||  || — || November 20, 2003 || Socorro || LINEAR || — || align=right | 3.4 km || 
|-id=087 bgcolor=#E9E9E9
| 204087 ||  || — || November 20, 2003 || Socorro || LINEAR || — || align=right | 3.2 km || 
|-id=088 bgcolor=#d6d6d6
| 204088 ||  || — || November 18, 2003 || Kitt Peak || Spacewatch || — || align=right | 3.6 km || 
|-id=089 bgcolor=#d6d6d6
| 204089 ||  || — || November 18, 2003 || Kitt Peak || Spacewatch || KOR || align=right | 2.4 km || 
|-id=090 bgcolor=#d6d6d6
| 204090 ||  || — || November 19, 2003 || Kitt Peak || Spacewatch || K-2 || align=right | 1.9 km || 
|-id=091 bgcolor=#E9E9E9
| 204091 ||  || — || November 19, 2003 || Kitt Peak || Spacewatch || WIT || align=right | 1.8 km || 
|-id=092 bgcolor=#E9E9E9
| 204092 ||  || — || November 19, 2003 || Campo Imperatore || CINEOS || — || align=right | 2.5 km || 
|-id=093 bgcolor=#E9E9E9
| 204093 ||  || — || November 20, 2003 || Socorro || LINEAR || — || align=right | 4.6 km || 
|-id=094 bgcolor=#E9E9E9
| 204094 ||  || — || November 20, 2003 || Catalina || CSS || — || align=right | 4.3 km || 
|-id=095 bgcolor=#E9E9E9
| 204095 ||  || — || November 20, 2003 || Socorro || LINEAR || — || align=right | 3.3 km || 
|-id=096 bgcolor=#E9E9E9
| 204096 ||  || — || November 20, 2003 || Socorro || LINEAR || — || align=right | 4.5 km || 
|-id=097 bgcolor=#E9E9E9
| 204097 ||  || — || November 20, 2003 || Socorro || LINEAR || — || align=right | 1.6 km || 
|-id=098 bgcolor=#E9E9E9
| 204098 ||  || — || November 21, 2003 || Socorro || LINEAR || — || align=right | 3.9 km || 
|-id=099 bgcolor=#E9E9E9
| 204099 ||  || — || November 20, 2003 || Socorro || LINEAR || MIT || align=right | 4.1 km || 
|-id=100 bgcolor=#E9E9E9
| 204100 ||  || — || November 20, 2003 || Socorro || LINEAR || HEN || align=right | 1.4 km || 
|}

204101–204200 

|-bgcolor=#E9E9E9
| 204101 ||  || — || November 21, 2003 || Palomar || NEAT || — || align=right | 4.1 km || 
|-id=102 bgcolor=#d6d6d6
| 204102 ||  || — || November 21, 2003 || Socorro || LINEAR || — || align=right | 3.5 km || 
|-id=103 bgcolor=#E9E9E9
| 204103 ||  || — || November 20, 2003 || Socorro || LINEAR || — || align=right | 2.4 km || 
|-id=104 bgcolor=#d6d6d6
| 204104 ||  || — || November 20, 2003 || Socorro || LINEAR || — || align=right | 2.6 km || 
|-id=105 bgcolor=#E9E9E9
| 204105 ||  || — || November 20, 2003 || Socorro || LINEAR || — || align=right | 2.1 km || 
|-id=106 bgcolor=#d6d6d6
| 204106 ||  || — || November 20, 2003 || Socorro || LINEAR || — || align=right | 4.9 km || 
|-id=107 bgcolor=#E9E9E9
| 204107 ||  || — || November 21, 2003 || Socorro || LINEAR || PAD || align=right | 3.1 km || 
|-id=108 bgcolor=#E9E9E9
| 204108 ||  || — || November 21, 2003 || Socorro || LINEAR || — || align=right | 1.5 km || 
|-id=109 bgcolor=#d6d6d6
| 204109 ||  || — || November 21, 2003 || Socorro || LINEAR || — || align=right | 5.2 km || 
|-id=110 bgcolor=#d6d6d6
| 204110 ||  || — || November 21, 2003 || Socorro || LINEAR || TRP || align=right | 3.9 km || 
|-id=111 bgcolor=#E9E9E9
| 204111 ||  || — || November 24, 2003 || Kitt Peak || Spacewatch || — || align=right | 3.4 km || 
|-id=112 bgcolor=#E9E9E9
| 204112 ||  || — || November 24, 2003 || Anderson Mesa || LONEOS || HEN || align=right | 1.6 km || 
|-id=113 bgcolor=#E9E9E9
| 204113 ||  || — || November 26, 2003 || Socorro || LINEAR || HEN || align=right | 1.7 km || 
|-id=114 bgcolor=#E9E9E9
| 204114 ||  || — || November 26, 2003 || Kitt Peak || Spacewatch || NEM || align=right | 3.2 km || 
|-id=115 bgcolor=#d6d6d6
| 204115 ||  || — || November 26, 2003 || Kitt Peak || Spacewatch || BRA || align=right | 2.7 km || 
|-id=116 bgcolor=#E9E9E9
| 204116 ||  || — || November 29, 2003 || Socorro || LINEAR || — || align=right | 4.5 km || 
|-id=117 bgcolor=#E9E9E9
| 204117 ||  || — || November 24, 2003 || Socorro || LINEAR || — || align=right | 3.9 km || 
|-id=118 bgcolor=#E9E9E9
| 204118 ||  || — || November 30, 2003 || Socorro || LINEAR || GER || align=right | 4.8 km || 
|-id=119 bgcolor=#E9E9E9
| 204119 ||  || — || November 30, 2003 || Kitt Peak || Spacewatch || — || align=right | 2.7 km || 
|-id=120 bgcolor=#fefefe
| 204120 ||  || — || November 24, 2003 || Socorro || LINEAR || H || align=right data-sort-value="0.91" | 910 m || 
|-id=121 bgcolor=#d6d6d6
| 204121 ||  || — || November 19, 2003 || Socorro || LINEAR || SAN || align=right | 2.5 km || 
|-id=122 bgcolor=#d6d6d6
| 204122 ||  || — || December 3, 2003 || Socorro || LINEAR || — || align=right | 5.3 km || 
|-id=123 bgcolor=#d6d6d6
| 204123 ||  || — || December 3, 2003 || Socorro || LINEAR || EOS || align=right | 3.0 km || 
|-id=124 bgcolor=#E9E9E9
| 204124 ||  || — || December 10, 2003 || Palomar || NEAT || — || align=right | 4.4 km || 
|-id=125 bgcolor=#E9E9E9
| 204125 ||  || — || December 14, 2003 || Palomar || NEAT || — || align=right | 4.8 km || 
|-id=126 bgcolor=#E9E9E9
| 204126 ||  || — || December 14, 2003 || Kitt Peak || Spacewatch || — || align=right | 4.0 km || 
|-id=127 bgcolor=#E9E9E9
| 204127 ||  || — || December 1, 2003 || Socorro || LINEAR || MRX || align=right | 1.8 km || 
|-id=128 bgcolor=#d6d6d6
| 204128 ||  || — || December 1, 2003 || Kitt Peak || Spacewatch || — || align=right | 2.4 km || 
|-id=129 bgcolor=#d6d6d6
| 204129 ||  || — || December 3, 2003 || Socorro || LINEAR || — || align=right | 2.9 km || 
|-id=130 bgcolor=#E9E9E9
| 204130 ||  || — || December 14, 2003 || Socorro || LINEAR || CLO || align=right | 4.3 km || 
|-id=131 bgcolor=#FFC2E0
| 204131 || 2003 YL || — || December 17, 2003 || Anderson Mesa || LONEOS || APO || align=right data-sort-value="0.37" | 370 m || 
|-id=132 bgcolor=#E9E9E9
| 204132 ||  || — || December 17, 2003 || Kitt Peak || Spacewatch || — || align=right | 3.2 km || 
|-id=133 bgcolor=#d6d6d6
| 204133 ||  || — || December 17, 2003 || Kitt Peak || Spacewatch || BRA || align=right | 2.2 km || 
|-id=134 bgcolor=#d6d6d6
| 204134 ||  || — || December 18, 2003 || Kitt Peak || Spacewatch || — || align=right | 5.7 km || 
|-id=135 bgcolor=#d6d6d6
| 204135 ||  || — || December 17, 2003 || Palomar || NEAT || — || align=right | 4.4 km || 
|-id=136 bgcolor=#d6d6d6
| 204136 ||  || — || December 18, 2003 || Catalina || CSS || — || align=right | 7.2 km || 
|-id=137 bgcolor=#d6d6d6
| 204137 ||  || — || December 19, 2003 || Kitt Peak || Spacewatch || — || align=right | 2.9 km || 
|-id=138 bgcolor=#d6d6d6
| 204138 ||  || — || December 17, 2003 || Kitt Peak || Spacewatch || EOS || align=right | 3.7 km || 
|-id=139 bgcolor=#d6d6d6
| 204139 ||  || — || December 18, 2003 || Socorro || LINEAR || CHA || align=right | 3.7 km || 
|-id=140 bgcolor=#d6d6d6
| 204140 ||  || — || December 19, 2003 || Socorro || LINEAR || KOR || align=right | 2.7 km || 
|-id=141 bgcolor=#d6d6d6
| 204141 ||  || — || December 19, 2003 || Socorro || LINEAR || — || align=right | 3.4 km || 
|-id=142 bgcolor=#d6d6d6
| 204142 ||  || — || December 19, 2003 || Socorro || LINEAR || — || align=right | 4.5 km || 
|-id=143 bgcolor=#fefefe
| 204143 ||  || — || December 19, 2003 || Socorro || LINEAR || H || align=right data-sort-value="0.99" | 990 m || 
|-id=144 bgcolor=#d6d6d6
| 204144 ||  || — || December 21, 2003 || Catalina || CSS || LUT || align=right | 9.5 km || 
|-id=145 bgcolor=#d6d6d6
| 204145 ||  || — || December 21, 2003 || Socorro || LINEAR || — || align=right | 5.4 km || 
|-id=146 bgcolor=#d6d6d6
| 204146 ||  || — || December 21, 2003 || Socorro || LINEAR || — || align=right | 4.6 km || 
|-id=147 bgcolor=#d6d6d6
| 204147 ||  || — || December 23, 2003 || Socorro || LINEAR || VER || align=right | 5.0 km || 
|-id=148 bgcolor=#E9E9E9
| 204148 ||  || — || December 21, 2003 || Needville || W. G. Dillon, M. Knewtson || — || align=right | 3.8 km || 
|-id=149 bgcolor=#E9E9E9
| 204149 ||  || — || December 23, 2003 || Socorro || LINEAR || JUN || align=right | 2.2 km || 
|-id=150 bgcolor=#d6d6d6
| 204150 ||  || — || December 25, 2003 || Haleakala || NEAT || — || align=right | 5.0 km || 
|-id=151 bgcolor=#d6d6d6
| 204151 ||  || — || December 27, 2003 || Socorro || LINEAR || — || align=right | 3.4 km || 
|-id=152 bgcolor=#d6d6d6
| 204152 ||  || — || December 27, 2003 || Kitt Peak || Spacewatch || — || align=right | 2.5 km || 
|-id=153 bgcolor=#d6d6d6
| 204153 ||  || — || December 18, 2003 || Socorro || LINEAR || — || align=right | 4.2 km || 
|-id=154 bgcolor=#d6d6d6
| 204154 ||  || — || December 18, 2003 || Socorro || LINEAR || — || align=right | 2.9 km || 
|-id=155 bgcolor=#d6d6d6
| 204155 ||  || — || December 18, 2003 || Kitt Peak || Spacewatch || EOS || align=right | 3.2 km || 
|-id=156 bgcolor=#d6d6d6
| 204156 ||  || — || January 14, 2004 || Palomar || NEAT || — || align=right | 3.9 km || 
|-id=157 bgcolor=#d6d6d6
| 204157 ||  || — || January 13, 2004 || Anderson Mesa || LONEOS || — || align=right | 3.7 km || 
|-id=158 bgcolor=#d6d6d6
| 204158 ||  || — || January 13, 2004 || Kitt Peak || Spacewatch || — || align=right | 4.8 km || 
|-id=159 bgcolor=#d6d6d6
| 204159 ||  || — || January 15, 2004 || Kitt Peak || Spacewatch || THM || align=right | 2.8 km || 
|-id=160 bgcolor=#d6d6d6
| 204160 ||  || — || January 16, 2004 || Kitt Peak || Spacewatch || — || align=right | 3.1 km || 
|-id=161 bgcolor=#d6d6d6
| 204161 ||  || — || January 16, 2004 || Palomar || NEAT || — || align=right | 6.2 km || 
|-id=162 bgcolor=#d6d6d6
| 204162 ||  || — || January 18, 2004 || Palomar || NEAT || — || align=right | 4.3 km || 
|-id=163 bgcolor=#d6d6d6
| 204163 ||  || — || January 17, 2004 || Palomar || NEAT || ELF || align=right | 5.1 km || 
|-id=164 bgcolor=#d6d6d6
| 204164 ||  || — || January 18, 2004 || Kitt Peak || Spacewatch || EOS || align=right | 2.5 km || 
|-id=165 bgcolor=#d6d6d6
| 204165 ||  || — || January 20, 2004 || Socorro || LINEAR || CHA || align=right | 3.3 km || 
|-id=166 bgcolor=#d6d6d6
| 204166 ||  || — || January 18, 2004 || Palomar || NEAT || — || align=right | 4.1 km || 
|-id=167 bgcolor=#d6d6d6
| 204167 ||  || — || January 19, 2004 || Anderson Mesa || LONEOS || ANF || align=right | 4.9 km || 
|-id=168 bgcolor=#d6d6d6
| 204168 ||  || — || January 19, 2004 || Anderson Mesa || LONEOS || HYG || align=right | 3.4 km || 
|-id=169 bgcolor=#d6d6d6
| 204169 ||  || — || January 19, 2004 || Kitt Peak || Spacewatch || THM || align=right | 4.4 km || 
|-id=170 bgcolor=#d6d6d6
| 204170 ||  || — || January 19, 2004 || Kitt Peak || Spacewatch || THM || align=right | 2.6 km || 
|-id=171 bgcolor=#d6d6d6
| 204171 ||  || — || January 19, 2004 || Kitt Peak || Spacewatch || — || align=right | 3.3 km || 
|-id=172 bgcolor=#d6d6d6
| 204172 ||  || — || January 19, 2004 || Kitt Peak || Spacewatch || KOR || align=right | 1.9 km || 
|-id=173 bgcolor=#d6d6d6
| 204173 ||  || — || January 19, 2004 || Kitt Peak || Spacewatch || — || align=right | 3.4 km || 
|-id=174 bgcolor=#d6d6d6
| 204174 ||  || — || January 19, 2004 || Kitt Peak || Spacewatch || THM || align=right | 4.8 km || 
|-id=175 bgcolor=#d6d6d6
| 204175 ||  || — || January 21, 2004 || Socorro || LINEAR || THM || align=right | 3.3 km || 
|-id=176 bgcolor=#d6d6d6
| 204176 ||  || — || January 23, 2004 || Anderson Mesa || LONEOS || — || align=right | 4.3 km || 
|-id=177 bgcolor=#d6d6d6
| 204177 ||  || — || January 22, 2004 || Socorro || LINEAR || — || align=right | 4.1 km || 
|-id=178 bgcolor=#d6d6d6
| 204178 ||  || — || January 21, 2004 || Socorro || LINEAR || — || align=right | 2.8 km || 
|-id=179 bgcolor=#d6d6d6
| 204179 ||  || — || January 21, 2004 || Socorro || LINEAR || — || align=right | 4.1 km || 
|-id=180 bgcolor=#d6d6d6
| 204180 ||  || — || January 21, 2004 || Socorro || LINEAR || EOS || align=right | 3.2 km || 
|-id=181 bgcolor=#d6d6d6
| 204181 ||  || — || January 21, 2004 || Socorro || LINEAR || — || align=right | 3.6 km || 
|-id=182 bgcolor=#d6d6d6
| 204182 ||  || — || January 22, 2004 || Socorro || LINEAR || — || align=right | 3.9 km || 
|-id=183 bgcolor=#d6d6d6
| 204183 ||  || — || January 22, 2004 || Socorro || LINEAR || — || align=right | 2.7 km || 
|-id=184 bgcolor=#E9E9E9
| 204184 ||  || — || January 22, 2004 || Socorro || LINEAR || — || align=right | 4.8 km || 
|-id=185 bgcolor=#d6d6d6
| 204185 ||  || — || January 22, 2004 || Socorro || LINEAR || — || align=right | 3.7 km || 
|-id=186 bgcolor=#d6d6d6
| 204186 ||  || — || January 23, 2004 || Anderson Mesa || LONEOS || — || align=right | 5.5 km || 
|-id=187 bgcolor=#E9E9E9
| 204187 ||  || — || January 23, 2004 || Socorro || LINEAR || DOR || align=right | 3.6 km || 
|-id=188 bgcolor=#d6d6d6
| 204188 ||  || — || January 22, 2004 || Socorro || LINEAR || — || align=right | 2.9 km || 
|-id=189 bgcolor=#d6d6d6
| 204189 ||  || — || January 24, 2004 || Socorro || LINEAR || — || align=right | 3.5 km || 
|-id=190 bgcolor=#d6d6d6
| 204190 ||  || — || January 22, 2004 || Socorro || LINEAR || — || align=right | 3.4 km || 
|-id=191 bgcolor=#d6d6d6
| 204191 ||  || — || January 24, 2004 || Socorro || LINEAR || HYG || align=right | 4.0 km || 
|-id=192 bgcolor=#d6d6d6
| 204192 ||  || — || January 23, 2004 || Socorro || LINEAR || — || align=right | 4.6 km || 
|-id=193 bgcolor=#d6d6d6
| 204193 ||  || — || January 23, 2004 || Socorro || LINEAR || — || align=right | 4.6 km || 
|-id=194 bgcolor=#d6d6d6
| 204194 ||  || — || January 28, 2004 || Socorro || LINEAR || EUP || align=right | 6.4 km || 
|-id=195 bgcolor=#fefefe
| 204195 ||  || — || January 23, 2004 || Socorro || LINEAR || H || align=right | 1.1 km || 
|-id=196 bgcolor=#d6d6d6
| 204196 ||  || — || January 28, 2004 || Catalina || CSS || — || align=right | 3.2 km || 
|-id=197 bgcolor=#d6d6d6
| 204197 ||  || — || January 31, 2004 || Campo Imperatore || CINEOS || — || align=right | 3.6 km || 
|-id=198 bgcolor=#d6d6d6
| 204198 ||  || — || January 19, 2004 || Kitt Peak || Spacewatch || — || align=right | 3.1 km || 
|-id=199 bgcolor=#d6d6d6
| 204199 ||  || — || January 19, 2004 || Kitt Peak || Spacewatch || — || align=right | 3.3 km || 
|-id=200 bgcolor=#d6d6d6
| 204200 ||  || — || January 16, 2004 || Palomar || NEAT || TEL || align=right | 1.9 km || 
|}

204201–204300 

|-bgcolor=#d6d6d6
| 204201 ||  || — || January 17, 2004 || Haleakala || NEAT || URS || align=right | 6.0 km || 
|-id=202 bgcolor=#fefefe
| 204202 || 2004 CA || — || February 2, 2004 || Catalina || CSS || H || align=right data-sort-value="0.77" | 770 m || 
|-id=203 bgcolor=#d6d6d6
| 204203 ||  || — || February 10, 2004 || Catalina || CSS || — || align=right | 4.1 km || 
|-id=204 bgcolor=#d6d6d6
| 204204 ||  || — || February 11, 2004 || Kitt Peak || Spacewatch || — || align=right | 3.6 km || 
|-id=205 bgcolor=#d6d6d6
| 204205 ||  || — || February 11, 2004 || Catalina || CSS || EOS || align=right | 3.3 km || 
|-id=206 bgcolor=#d6d6d6
| 204206 ||  || — || February 11, 2004 || Anderson Mesa || LONEOS || — || align=right | 4.2 km || 
|-id=207 bgcolor=#d6d6d6
| 204207 ||  || — || February 11, 2004 || Kitt Peak || Spacewatch || — || align=right | 4.6 km || 
|-id=208 bgcolor=#d6d6d6
| 204208 ||  || — || February 11, 2004 || Palomar || NEAT || JLI || align=right | 4.1 km || 
|-id=209 bgcolor=#d6d6d6
| 204209 ||  || — || February 12, 2004 || Kitt Peak || Spacewatch || — || align=right | 3.4 km || 
|-id=210 bgcolor=#d6d6d6
| 204210 ||  || — || February 11, 2004 || Kitt Peak || Spacewatch || HYG || align=right | 3.9 km || 
|-id=211 bgcolor=#d6d6d6
| 204211 ||  || — || February 11, 2004 || Anderson Mesa || LONEOS || — || align=right | 4.5 km || 
|-id=212 bgcolor=#d6d6d6
| 204212 ||  || — || February 13, 2004 || Kitt Peak || Spacewatch || — || align=right | 3.0 km || 
|-id=213 bgcolor=#d6d6d6
| 204213 ||  || — || February 11, 2004 || Kitt Peak || Spacewatch || — || align=right | 3.9 km || 
|-id=214 bgcolor=#d6d6d6
| 204214 ||  || — || February 10, 2004 || Palomar || NEAT || IMH || align=right | 6.9 km || 
|-id=215 bgcolor=#d6d6d6
| 204215 ||  || — || February 15, 2004 || Socorro || LINEAR || — || align=right | 5.5 km || 
|-id=216 bgcolor=#d6d6d6
| 204216 ||  || — || February 11, 2004 || Palomar || NEAT || — || align=right | 4.3 km || 
|-id=217 bgcolor=#d6d6d6
| 204217 ||  || — || February 11, 2004 || Palomar || NEAT || HYG || align=right | 5.8 km || 
|-id=218 bgcolor=#d6d6d6
| 204218 ||  || — || February 11, 2004 || Palomar || NEAT || EOS || align=right | 3.1 km || 
|-id=219 bgcolor=#d6d6d6
| 204219 ||  || — || February 12, 2004 || Palomar || NEAT || — || align=right | 4.4 km || 
|-id=220 bgcolor=#d6d6d6
| 204220 ||  || — || February 14, 2004 || Kitt Peak || Spacewatch || — || align=right | 4.2 km || 
|-id=221 bgcolor=#d6d6d6
| 204221 ||  || — || February 14, 2004 || Kitt Peak || Spacewatch || THM || align=right | 4.3 km || 
|-id=222 bgcolor=#d6d6d6
| 204222 ||  || — || February 11, 2004 || Kitt Peak || Spacewatch || 629 || align=right | 2.3 km || 
|-id=223 bgcolor=#d6d6d6
| 204223 ||  || — || February 12, 2004 || Palomar || NEAT || HYG || align=right | 5.7 km || 
|-id=224 bgcolor=#E9E9E9
| 204224 ||  || — || February 15, 2004 || Socorro || LINEAR || — || align=right | 3.2 km || 
|-id=225 bgcolor=#d6d6d6
| 204225 ||  || — || February 14, 2004 || Catalina || CSS || — || align=right | 4.1 km || 
|-id=226 bgcolor=#d6d6d6
| 204226 ||  || — || February 12, 2004 || Palomar || NEAT || — || align=right | 4.5 km || 
|-id=227 bgcolor=#d6d6d6
| 204227 ||  || — || February 13, 2004 || Anderson Mesa || LONEOS || — || align=right | 4.4 km || 
|-id=228 bgcolor=#d6d6d6
| 204228 ||  || — || February 13, 2004 || Anderson Mesa || LONEOS || — || align=right | 5.1 km || 
|-id=229 bgcolor=#d6d6d6
| 204229 ||  || — || February 11, 2004 || Kitt Peak || Spacewatch || — || align=right | 5.5 km || 
|-id=230 bgcolor=#d6d6d6
| 204230 ||  || — || February 14, 2004 || Kitt Peak || Spacewatch || — || align=right | 3.5 km || 
|-id=231 bgcolor=#d6d6d6
| 204231 ||  || — || February 14, 2004 || Kitt Peak || Spacewatch || THM || align=right | 2.7 km || 
|-id=232 bgcolor=#FFC2E0
| 204232 ||  || — || February 19, 2004 || Socorro || LINEAR || APO || align=right data-sort-value="0.76" | 760 m || 
|-id=233 bgcolor=#d6d6d6
| 204233 ||  || — || February 16, 2004 || Kitt Peak || Spacewatch || — || align=right | 3.5 km || 
|-id=234 bgcolor=#d6d6d6
| 204234 ||  || — || February 18, 2004 || Socorro || LINEAR || — || align=right | 4.4 km || 
|-id=235 bgcolor=#d6d6d6
| 204235 ||  || — || February 17, 2004 || Socorro || LINEAR || THB || align=right | 4.5 km || 
|-id=236 bgcolor=#d6d6d6
| 204236 ||  || — || February 18, 2004 || Socorro || LINEAR || — || align=right | 4.0 km || 
|-id=237 bgcolor=#d6d6d6
| 204237 ||  || — || February 18, 2004 || Socorro || LINEAR || THM || align=right | 4.6 km || 
|-id=238 bgcolor=#d6d6d6
| 204238 ||  || — || February 18, 2004 || Socorro || LINEAR || THM || align=right | 3.6 km || 
|-id=239 bgcolor=#FA8072
| 204239 ||  || — || February 23, 2004 || Socorro || LINEAR || H || align=right | 1.3 km || 
|-id=240 bgcolor=#d6d6d6
| 204240 ||  || — || February 19, 2004 || Socorro || LINEAR || BRA || align=right | 2.4 km || 
|-id=241 bgcolor=#d6d6d6
| 204241 ||  || — || February 19, 2004 || Socorro || LINEAR || THM || align=right | 4.8 km || 
|-id=242 bgcolor=#d6d6d6
| 204242 ||  || — || February 19, 2004 || Socorro || LINEAR || — || align=right | 3.4 km || 
|-id=243 bgcolor=#d6d6d6
| 204243 ||  || — || February 22, 2004 || Kitt Peak || Spacewatch || — || align=right | 5.2 km || 
|-id=244 bgcolor=#d6d6d6
| 204244 ||  || — || February 22, 2004 || Kitt Peak || Spacewatch || — || align=right | 4.5 km || 
|-id=245 bgcolor=#d6d6d6
| 204245 ||  || — || February 22, 2004 || Kitt Peak || Spacewatch || — || align=right | 4.3 km || 
|-id=246 bgcolor=#d6d6d6
| 204246 ||  || — || February 22, 2004 || Kitt Peak || Spacewatch || — || align=right | 4.1 km || 
|-id=247 bgcolor=#d6d6d6
| 204247 ||  || — || February 23, 2004 || Socorro || LINEAR || THM || align=right | 2.9 km || 
|-id=248 bgcolor=#fefefe
| 204248 ||  || — || March 14, 2004 || Socorro || LINEAR || H || align=right data-sort-value="0.97" | 970 m || 
|-id=249 bgcolor=#d6d6d6
| 204249 ||  || — || March 11, 2004 || Palomar || NEAT || THM || align=right | 3.6 km || 
|-id=250 bgcolor=#d6d6d6
| 204250 ||  || — || March 14, 2004 || Kitt Peak || Spacewatch || THM || align=right | 3.3 km || 
|-id=251 bgcolor=#d6d6d6
| 204251 ||  || — || March 15, 2004 || Kitt Peak || Spacewatch || — || align=right | 2.6 km || 
|-id=252 bgcolor=#d6d6d6
| 204252 ||  || — || March 14, 2004 || Palomar || NEAT || — || align=right | 3.6 km || 
|-id=253 bgcolor=#d6d6d6
| 204253 ||  || — || March 14, 2004 || Palomar || NEAT || — || align=right | 5.5 km || 
|-id=254 bgcolor=#d6d6d6
| 204254 ||  || — || March 14, 2004 || Palomar || NEAT || TIR || align=right | 4.5 km || 
|-id=255 bgcolor=#d6d6d6
| 204255 ||  || — || March 15, 2004 || Palomar || NEAT || — || align=right | 3.3 km || 
|-id=256 bgcolor=#d6d6d6
| 204256 ||  || — || March 15, 2004 || Socorro || LINEAR || TIR || align=right | 4.9 km || 
|-id=257 bgcolor=#d6d6d6
| 204257 ||  || — || March 13, 2004 || Palomar || NEAT || THM || align=right | 4.7 km || 
|-id=258 bgcolor=#d6d6d6
| 204258 ||  || — || March 15, 2004 || Catalina || CSS || — || align=right | 4.2 km || 
|-id=259 bgcolor=#d6d6d6
| 204259 ||  || — || March 15, 2004 || Catalina || CSS || HYG || align=right | 4.7 km || 
|-id=260 bgcolor=#E9E9E9
| 204260 ||  || — || March 17, 2004 || Mount Graham || W. H. Ryan, C. T. Martinez || — || align=right | 4.2 km || 
|-id=261 bgcolor=#d6d6d6
| 204261 ||  || — || March 26, 2004 || Socorro || LINEAR || EUP || align=right | 6.6 km || 
|-id=262 bgcolor=#d6d6d6
| 204262 ||  || — || March 16, 2004 || Socorro || LINEAR || — || align=right | 4.5 km || 
|-id=263 bgcolor=#d6d6d6
| 204263 ||  || — || March 19, 2004 || Catalina || CSS || — || align=right | 5.7 km || 
|-id=264 bgcolor=#fefefe
| 204264 ||  || — || March 17, 2004 || Palomar || NEAT || H || align=right | 1.1 km || 
|-id=265 bgcolor=#d6d6d6
| 204265 ||  || — || March 30, 2004 || Socorro || LINEAR || Tj (2.98) || align=right | 4.7 km || 
|-id=266 bgcolor=#d6d6d6
| 204266 ||  || — || March 16, 2004 || Catalina || CSS || — || align=right | 3.9 km || 
|-id=267 bgcolor=#d6d6d6
| 204267 ||  || — || March 17, 2004 || Socorro || LINEAR || — || align=right | 4.0 km || 
|-id=268 bgcolor=#d6d6d6
| 204268 ||  || — || March 18, 2004 || Socorro || LINEAR || — || align=right | 5.6 km || 
|-id=269 bgcolor=#d6d6d6
| 204269 ||  || — || March 18, 2004 || Catalina || CSS || — || align=right | 4.7 km || 
|-id=270 bgcolor=#d6d6d6
| 204270 ||  || — || March 18, 2004 || Socorro || LINEAR || THM || align=right | 4.4 km || 
|-id=271 bgcolor=#d6d6d6
| 204271 ||  || — || March 22, 2004 || Socorro || LINEAR || — || align=right | 5.8 km || 
|-id=272 bgcolor=#d6d6d6
| 204272 ||  || — || March 23, 2004 || Socorro || LINEAR || THM || align=right | 2.9 km || 
|-id=273 bgcolor=#d6d6d6
| 204273 ||  || — || March 22, 2004 || Anderson Mesa || LONEOS || — || align=right | 3.9 km || 
|-id=274 bgcolor=#d6d6d6
| 204274 ||  || — || March 27, 2004 || Socorro || LINEAR || 7:4 || align=right | 8.8 km || 
|-id=275 bgcolor=#d6d6d6
| 204275 ||  || — || March 29, 2004 || Catalina || CSS || — || align=right | 6.7 km || 
|-id=276 bgcolor=#d6d6d6
| 204276 ||  || — || March 30, 2004 || Kitt Peak || Spacewatch || — || align=right | 3.6 km || 
|-id=277 bgcolor=#fefefe
| 204277 ||  || — || April 14, 2004 || Socorro || LINEAR || H || align=right | 1.3 km || 
|-id=278 bgcolor=#fefefe
| 204278 ||  || — || April 17, 2004 || Socorro || LINEAR || H || align=right data-sort-value="0.90" | 900 m || 
|-id=279 bgcolor=#d6d6d6
| 204279 ||  || — || April 17, 2004 || Socorro || LINEAR || — || align=right | 3.6 km || 
|-id=280 bgcolor=#fefefe
| 204280 ||  || — || April 17, 2004 || Socorro || LINEAR || — || align=right | 1.2 km || 
|-id=281 bgcolor=#d6d6d6
| 204281 ||  || — || April 23, 2004 || Catalina || CSS || — || align=right | 6.7 km || 
|-id=282 bgcolor=#fefefe
| 204282 ||  || — || May 27, 2004 || Kitt Peak || Spacewatch || — || align=right | 1.1 km || 
|-id=283 bgcolor=#fefefe
| 204283 ||  || — || June 12, 2004 || Catalina || CSS || — || align=right | 1.5 km || 
|-id=284 bgcolor=#fefefe
| 204284 ||  || — || June 11, 2004 || Palomar || NEAT || — || align=right data-sort-value="0.82" | 820 m || 
|-id=285 bgcolor=#fefefe
| 204285 ||  || — || June 15, 2004 || Socorro || LINEAR || — || align=right | 1.1 km || 
|-id=286 bgcolor=#fefefe
| 204286 ||  || — || June 16, 2004 || Socorro || LINEAR || — || align=right | 1.4 km || 
|-id=287 bgcolor=#fefefe
| 204287 ||  || — || July 11, 2004 || Socorro || LINEAR || V || align=right data-sort-value="0.82" | 820 m || 
|-id=288 bgcolor=#fefefe
| 204288 ||  || — || July 16, 2004 || Socorro || LINEAR || FLO || align=right data-sort-value="0.86" | 860 m || 
|-id=289 bgcolor=#fefefe
| 204289 ||  || — || August 3, 2004 || Siding Spring || SSS || FLO || align=right data-sort-value="0.93" | 930 m || 
|-id=290 bgcolor=#fefefe
| 204290 ||  || — || August 8, 2004 || Palomar || NEAT || — || align=right | 1.1 km || 
|-id=291 bgcolor=#fefefe
| 204291 ||  || — || August 8, 2004 || Reedy Creek || J. Broughton || ERI || align=right | 1.7 km || 
|-id=292 bgcolor=#fefefe
| 204292 ||  || — || August 8, 2004 || Anderson Mesa || LONEOS || FLO || align=right data-sort-value="0.74" | 740 m || 
|-id=293 bgcolor=#fefefe
| 204293 ||  || — || August 8, 2004 || Anderson Mesa || LONEOS || — || align=right | 1.4 km || 
|-id=294 bgcolor=#fefefe
| 204294 ||  || — || August 9, 2004 || Socorro || LINEAR || — || align=right | 1.3 km || 
|-id=295 bgcolor=#fefefe
| 204295 ||  || — || August 7, 2004 || Palomar || NEAT || NYS || align=right data-sort-value="0.77" | 770 m || 
|-id=296 bgcolor=#fefefe
| 204296 ||  || — || August 9, 2004 || Socorro || LINEAR || — || align=right | 1.1 km || 
|-id=297 bgcolor=#fefefe
| 204297 ||  || — || August 9, 2004 || Socorro || LINEAR || V || align=right | 1.2 km || 
|-id=298 bgcolor=#fefefe
| 204298 ||  || — || August 10, 2004 || Socorro || LINEAR || NYS || align=right | 1.0 km || 
|-id=299 bgcolor=#fefefe
| 204299 ||  || — || August 8, 2004 || Socorro || LINEAR || — || align=right | 1.2 km || 
|-id=300 bgcolor=#fefefe
| 204300 ||  || — || August 9, 2004 || Anderson Mesa || LONEOS || FLO || align=right data-sort-value="0.94" | 940 m || 
|}

204301–204400 

|-bgcolor=#fefefe
| 204301 ||  || — || August 10, 2004 || Socorro || LINEAR || MAS || align=right | 1.2 km || 
|-id=302 bgcolor=#fefefe
| 204302 ||  || — || August 10, 2004 || Socorro || LINEAR || — || align=right | 1.3 km || 
|-id=303 bgcolor=#fefefe
| 204303 ||  || — || August 11, 2004 || Socorro || LINEAR || ERI || align=right | 2.6 km || 
|-id=304 bgcolor=#fefefe
| 204304 ||  || — || August 10, 2004 || Socorro || LINEAR || NYS || align=right | 1.1 km || 
|-id=305 bgcolor=#fefefe
| 204305 ||  || — || August 11, 2004 || Socorro || LINEAR || NYS || align=right data-sort-value="0.94" | 940 m || 
|-id=306 bgcolor=#fefefe
| 204306 ||  || — || August 15, 2004 || Reedy Creek || J. Broughton || — || align=right | 1.0 km || 
|-id=307 bgcolor=#fefefe
| 204307 ||  || — || August 9, 2004 || Socorro || LINEAR || — || align=right | 1.3 km || 
|-id=308 bgcolor=#fefefe
| 204308 ||  || — || August 12, 2004 || Socorro || LINEAR || NYS || align=right data-sort-value="0.96" | 960 m || 
|-id=309 bgcolor=#FA8072
| 204309 ||  || — || September 4, 2004 || Palomar || NEAT || — || align=right | 1.7 km || 
|-id=310 bgcolor=#fefefe
| 204310 ||  || — || September 7, 2004 || Kitt Peak || Spacewatch || NYS || align=right data-sort-value="0.79" | 790 m || 
|-id=311 bgcolor=#fefefe
| 204311 ||  || — || September 7, 2004 || Socorro || LINEAR || NYS || align=right | 1.0 km || 
|-id=312 bgcolor=#fefefe
| 204312 ||  || — || September 7, 2004 || Socorro || LINEAR || NYS || align=right data-sort-value="0.92" | 920 m || 
|-id=313 bgcolor=#fefefe
| 204313 ||  || — || September 7, 2004 || Socorro || LINEAR || — || align=right data-sort-value="0.97" | 970 m || 
|-id=314 bgcolor=#fefefe
| 204314 ||  || — || September 7, 2004 || Socorro || LINEAR || — || align=right data-sort-value="0.94" | 940 m || 
|-id=315 bgcolor=#fefefe
| 204315 ||  || — || September 7, 2004 || Socorro || LINEAR || — || align=right | 1.2 km || 
|-id=316 bgcolor=#fefefe
| 204316 ||  || — || September 8, 2004 || Socorro || LINEAR || NYS || align=right data-sort-value="0.82" | 820 m || 
|-id=317 bgcolor=#fefefe
| 204317 ||  || — || September 8, 2004 || Socorro || LINEAR || MAS || align=right data-sort-value="0.98" | 980 m || 
|-id=318 bgcolor=#fefefe
| 204318 ||  || — || September 8, 2004 || Socorro || LINEAR || — || align=right | 1.3 km || 
|-id=319 bgcolor=#fefefe
| 204319 ||  || — || September 8, 2004 || Socorro || LINEAR || NYS || align=right data-sort-value="0.89" | 890 m || 
|-id=320 bgcolor=#fefefe
| 204320 ||  || — || September 8, 2004 || Socorro || LINEAR || EUT || align=right data-sort-value="0.90" | 900 m || 
|-id=321 bgcolor=#fefefe
| 204321 ||  || — || September 8, 2004 || Socorro || LINEAR || NYS || align=right data-sort-value="0.70" | 700 m || 
|-id=322 bgcolor=#fefefe
| 204322 ||  || — || September 8, 2004 || Socorro || LINEAR || — || align=right | 1.1 km || 
|-id=323 bgcolor=#E9E9E9
| 204323 ||  || — || September 9, 2004 || Socorro || LINEAR || — || align=right | 1.1 km || 
|-id=324 bgcolor=#fefefe
| 204324 ||  || — || September 8, 2004 || Socorro || LINEAR || — || align=right | 1.1 km || 
|-id=325 bgcolor=#fefefe
| 204325 ||  || — || September 8, 2004 || Socorro || LINEAR || — || align=right | 1.0 km || 
|-id=326 bgcolor=#fefefe
| 204326 ||  || — || September 8, 2004 || Palomar || NEAT || V || align=right | 1.2 km || 
|-id=327 bgcolor=#fefefe
| 204327 ||  || — || September 8, 2004 || Palomar || NEAT || KLI || align=right | 3.5 km || 
|-id=328 bgcolor=#fefefe
| 204328 ||  || — || September 7, 2004 || Kitt Peak || Spacewatch || — || align=right data-sort-value="0.95" | 950 m || 
|-id=329 bgcolor=#fefefe
| 204329 ||  || — || September 10, 2004 || Socorro || LINEAR || — || align=right | 1.2 km || 
|-id=330 bgcolor=#fefefe
| 204330 ||  || — || September 10, 2004 || Socorro || LINEAR || — || align=right | 1.2 km || 
|-id=331 bgcolor=#fefefe
| 204331 ||  || — || September 10, 2004 || Socorro || LINEAR || — || align=right | 1.3 km || 
|-id=332 bgcolor=#fefefe
| 204332 ||  || — || September 11, 2004 || Socorro || LINEAR || — || align=right | 1.0 km || 
|-id=333 bgcolor=#E9E9E9
| 204333 ||  || — || September 9, 2004 || Kitt Peak || Spacewatch || — || align=right | 1.2 km || 
|-id=334 bgcolor=#fefefe
| 204334 ||  || — || September 9, 2004 || Kitt Peak || Spacewatch || — || align=right | 1.2 km || 
|-id=335 bgcolor=#fefefe
| 204335 ||  || — || September 10, 2004 || Socorro || LINEAR || FLO || align=right data-sort-value="0.83" | 830 m || 
|-id=336 bgcolor=#fefefe
| 204336 ||  || — || September 10, 2004 || Socorro || LINEAR || — || align=right | 1.2 km || 
|-id=337 bgcolor=#fefefe
| 204337 ||  || — || September 14, 2004 || Palomar || NEAT || NYS || align=right data-sort-value="0.79" | 790 m || 
|-id=338 bgcolor=#fefefe
| 204338 ||  || — || September 15, 2004 || Three Buttes || G. R. Jones || — || align=right | 1.0 km || 
|-id=339 bgcolor=#fefefe
| 204339 ||  || — || September 6, 2004 || Palomar || NEAT || V || align=right | 1.1 km || 
|-id=340 bgcolor=#fefefe
| 204340 ||  || — || September 15, 2004 || 7300 Observatory || W. K. Y. Yeung || NYS || align=right | 1.1 km || 
|-id=341 bgcolor=#fefefe
| 204341 ||  || — || September 15, 2004 || Kitt Peak || Spacewatch || MAS || align=right | 1.0 km || 
|-id=342 bgcolor=#fefefe
| 204342 ||  || — || September 7, 2004 || Bergisch Gladbach || W. Bickel || — || align=right data-sort-value="0.97" | 970 m || 
|-id=343 bgcolor=#fefefe
| 204343 ||  || — || September 13, 2004 || Socorro || LINEAR || — || align=right | 1.5 km || 
|-id=344 bgcolor=#fefefe
| 204344 ||  || — || September 13, 2004 || Socorro || LINEAR || — || align=right | 1.8 km || 
|-id=345 bgcolor=#fefefe
| 204345 ||  || — || September 13, 2004 || Socorro || LINEAR || — || align=right | 1.4 km || 
|-id=346 bgcolor=#fefefe
| 204346 ||  || — || September 8, 2004 || Socorro || LINEAR || NYS || align=right data-sort-value="0.86" | 860 m || 
|-id=347 bgcolor=#fefefe
| 204347 ||  || — || September 11, 2004 || Socorro || LINEAR || — || align=right | 2.8 km || 
|-id=348 bgcolor=#fefefe
| 204348 ||  || — || September 8, 2004 || Socorro || LINEAR || — || align=right | 1.3 km || 
|-id=349 bgcolor=#fefefe
| 204349 ||  || — || September 17, 2004 || Kitt Peak || Spacewatch || NYS || align=right data-sort-value="0.84" | 840 m || 
|-id=350 bgcolor=#fefefe
| 204350 ||  || — || September 17, 2004 || Socorro || LINEAR || NYS || align=right data-sort-value="0.88" | 880 m || 
|-id=351 bgcolor=#fefefe
| 204351 ||  || — || September 17, 2004 || Socorro || LINEAR || — || align=right | 1.3 km || 
|-id=352 bgcolor=#fefefe
| 204352 ||  || — || September 17, 2004 || Socorro || LINEAR || MAS || align=right data-sort-value="0.94" | 940 m || 
|-id=353 bgcolor=#fefefe
| 204353 ||  || — || September 18, 2004 || Socorro || LINEAR || — || align=right | 2.7 km || 
|-id=354 bgcolor=#fefefe
| 204354 ||  || — || September 22, 2004 || Socorro || LINEAR || — || align=right | 1.1 km || 
|-id=355 bgcolor=#fefefe
| 204355 ||  || — || October 2, 2004 || Palomar || NEAT || — || align=right | 1.3 km || 
|-id=356 bgcolor=#fefefe
| 204356 ||  || — || October 3, 2004 || Palomar || NEAT || — || align=right | 1.4 km || 
|-id=357 bgcolor=#fefefe
| 204357 ||  || — || October 3, 2004 || Palomar || NEAT || — || align=right | 3.0 km || 
|-id=358 bgcolor=#fefefe
| 204358 ||  || — || October 4, 2004 || Anderson Mesa || LONEOS || — || align=right | 1.2 km || 
|-id=359 bgcolor=#fefefe
| 204359 ||  || — || October 6, 2004 || Yamagata || Yamagata Obs. || NYS || align=right data-sort-value="0.98" | 980 m || 
|-id=360 bgcolor=#fefefe
| 204360 ||  || — || October 5, 2004 || Goodricke-Pigott || R. A. Tucker || — || align=right | 1.1 km || 
|-id=361 bgcolor=#E9E9E9
| 204361 ||  || — || October 4, 2004 || Kitt Peak || Spacewatch || — || align=right | 2.8 km || 
|-id=362 bgcolor=#fefefe
| 204362 ||  || — || October 4, 2004 || Anderson Mesa || LONEOS || NYS || align=right data-sort-value="0.96" | 960 m || 
|-id=363 bgcolor=#fefefe
| 204363 ||  || — || October 4, 2004 || Anderson Mesa || LONEOS || — || align=right | 1.1 km || 
|-id=364 bgcolor=#fefefe
| 204364 ||  || — || October 4, 2004 || Anderson Mesa || LONEOS || — || align=right | 1.0 km || 
|-id=365 bgcolor=#fefefe
| 204365 ||  || — || October 4, 2004 || Kitt Peak || Spacewatch || V || align=right | 1.0 km || 
|-id=366 bgcolor=#E9E9E9
| 204366 ||  || — || October 4, 2004 || Kitt Peak || Spacewatch || EUN || align=right | 1.6 km || 
|-id=367 bgcolor=#fefefe
| 204367 ||  || — || October 5, 2004 || Kitt Peak || Spacewatch || MAS || align=right data-sort-value="0.98" | 980 m || 
|-id=368 bgcolor=#fefefe
| 204368 ||  || — || October 5, 2004 || Anderson Mesa || LONEOS || V || align=right | 1.1 km || 
|-id=369 bgcolor=#fefefe
| 204369 ||  || — || October 5, 2004 || Anderson Mesa || LONEOS || FLO || align=right | 1.0 km || 
|-id=370 bgcolor=#fefefe
| 204370 Ferdinandvaněk ||  ||  || October 5, 2004 || Kleť || KLENOT || FLO || align=right | 1.0 km || 
|-id=371 bgcolor=#fefefe
| 204371 ||  || — || October 6, 2004 || Kitt Peak || Spacewatch || MAS || align=right data-sort-value="0.98" | 980 m || 
|-id=372 bgcolor=#fefefe
| 204372 ||  || — || October 4, 2004 || Anderson Mesa || LONEOS || NYS || align=right | 2.3 km || 
|-id=373 bgcolor=#fefefe
| 204373 ||  || — || October 5, 2004 || Kitt Peak || Spacewatch || NYS || align=right data-sort-value="0.88" | 880 m || 
|-id=374 bgcolor=#fefefe
| 204374 ||  || — || October 5, 2004 || Kitt Peak || Spacewatch || EUT || align=right data-sort-value="0.90" | 900 m || 
|-id=375 bgcolor=#fefefe
| 204375 ||  || — || October 5, 2004 || Kitt Peak || Spacewatch || — || align=right | 1.6 km || 
|-id=376 bgcolor=#E9E9E9
| 204376 ||  || — || October 7, 2004 || Anderson Mesa || LONEOS || — || align=right | 1.1 km || 
|-id=377 bgcolor=#fefefe
| 204377 ||  || — || October 7, 2004 || Socorro || LINEAR || FLO || align=right data-sort-value="0.85" | 850 m || 
|-id=378 bgcolor=#fefefe
| 204378 ||  || — || October 9, 2004 || Anderson Mesa || LONEOS || NYS || align=right | 1.0 km || 
|-id=379 bgcolor=#fefefe
| 204379 ||  || — || October 6, 2004 || Palomar || NEAT || NYS || align=right | 2.6 km || 
|-id=380 bgcolor=#fefefe
| 204380 ||  || — || October 7, 2004 || Anderson Mesa || LONEOS || CLA || align=right | 2.3 km || 
|-id=381 bgcolor=#fefefe
| 204381 ||  || — || October 7, 2004 || Anderson Mesa || LONEOS || — || align=right data-sort-value="0.94" | 940 m || 
|-id=382 bgcolor=#fefefe
| 204382 ||  || — || October 7, 2004 || Socorro || LINEAR || V || align=right | 1.0 km || 
|-id=383 bgcolor=#fefefe
| 204383 ||  || — || October 7, 2004 || Socorro || LINEAR || NYS || align=right data-sort-value="0.98" | 980 m || 
|-id=384 bgcolor=#fefefe
| 204384 ||  || — || October 7, 2004 || Socorro || LINEAR || — || align=right | 2.1 km || 
|-id=385 bgcolor=#E9E9E9
| 204385 ||  || — || October 7, 2004 || Anderson Mesa || LONEOS || — || align=right | 1.9 km || 
|-id=386 bgcolor=#fefefe
| 204386 ||  || — || October 4, 2004 || Kitt Peak || Spacewatch || — || align=right | 1.1 km || 
|-id=387 bgcolor=#fefefe
| 204387 ||  || — || October 4, 2004 || Kitt Peak || Spacewatch || — || align=right | 1.3 km || 
|-id=388 bgcolor=#fefefe
| 204388 ||  || — || October 4, 2004 || Kitt Peak || Spacewatch || NYS || align=right | 1.5 km || 
|-id=389 bgcolor=#fefefe
| 204389 ||  || — || October 6, 2004 || Kitt Peak || Spacewatch || — || align=right | 1.0 km || 
|-id=390 bgcolor=#fefefe
| 204390 ||  || — || October 7, 2004 || Kitt Peak || Spacewatch || — || align=right | 1.0 km || 
|-id=391 bgcolor=#fefefe
| 204391 ||  || — || October 7, 2004 || Socorro || LINEAR || — || align=right | 1.2 km || 
|-id=392 bgcolor=#fefefe
| 204392 ||  || — || October 7, 2004 || Socorro || LINEAR || NYS || align=right data-sort-value="0.86" | 860 m || 
|-id=393 bgcolor=#E9E9E9
| 204393 ||  || — || October 9, 2004 || Kitt Peak || Spacewatch || — || align=right | 1.2 km || 
|-id=394 bgcolor=#fefefe
| 204394 ||  || — || October 9, 2004 || Kitt Peak || Spacewatch || — || align=right | 1.2 km || 
|-id=395 bgcolor=#fefefe
| 204395 ||  || — || October 9, 2004 || Kitt Peak || Spacewatch || — || align=right | 1.2 km || 
|-id=396 bgcolor=#fefefe
| 204396 ||  || — || October 10, 2004 || Kitt Peak || Spacewatch || — || align=right | 1.1 km || 
|-id=397 bgcolor=#fefefe
| 204397 ||  || — || October 9, 2004 || Kitt Peak || Spacewatch || — || align=right | 1.1 km || 
|-id=398 bgcolor=#fefefe
| 204398 ||  || — || October 10, 2004 || Kitt Peak || Spacewatch || — || align=right | 1.2 km || 
|-id=399 bgcolor=#fefefe
| 204399 ||  || — || October 10, 2004 || Kitt Peak || Spacewatch || NYS || align=right data-sort-value="0.72" | 720 m || 
|-id=400 bgcolor=#fefefe
| 204400 ||  || — || October 10, 2004 || Kitt Peak || Spacewatch || — || align=right | 1.2 km || 
|}

204401–204500 

|-bgcolor=#fefefe
| 204401 ||  || — || October 9, 2004 || Kitt Peak || Spacewatch || — || align=right data-sort-value="0.73" | 730 m || 
|-id=402 bgcolor=#E9E9E9
| 204402 ||  || — || October 19, 2004 || Socorro || LINEAR || — || align=right | 2.2 km || 
|-id=403 bgcolor=#fefefe
| 204403 || 2004 VT || — || November 2, 2004 || Anderson Mesa || LONEOS || V || align=right | 1.3 km || 
|-id=404 bgcolor=#fefefe
| 204404 ||  || — || November 3, 2004 || Palomar || NEAT || V || align=right data-sort-value="0.82" | 820 m || 
|-id=405 bgcolor=#fefefe
| 204405 ||  || — || November 3, 2004 || Kitt Peak || Spacewatch || — || align=right | 1.0 km || 
|-id=406 bgcolor=#fefefe
| 204406 ||  || — || November 3, 2004 || Palomar || NEAT || — || align=right | 1.6 km || 
|-id=407 bgcolor=#E9E9E9
| 204407 ||  || — || November 3, 2004 || Anderson Mesa || LONEOS || — || align=right | 1.5 km || 
|-id=408 bgcolor=#fefefe
| 204408 ||  || — || November 4, 2004 || Catalina || CSS || ERI || align=right | 2.5 km || 
|-id=409 bgcolor=#E9E9E9
| 204409 ||  || — || November 4, 2004 || Needville || J. Dellinger, D. Wells || — || align=right | 1.3 km || 
|-id=410 bgcolor=#fefefe
| 204410 ||  || — || November 3, 2004 || Kitt Peak || Spacewatch || V || align=right | 1.2 km || 
|-id=411 bgcolor=#fefefe
| 204411 ||  || — || November 3, 2004 || Kitt Peak || Spacewatch || NYS || align=right data-sort-value="0.95" | 950 m || 
|-id=412 bgcolor=#fefefe
| 204412 ||  || — || November 4, 2004 || Kitt Peak || Spacewatch || NYS || align=right data-sort-value="0.82" | 820 m || 
|-id=413 bgcolor=#fefefe
| 204413 ||  || — || November 4, 2004 || Kitt Peak || Spacewatch || — || align=right | 1.0 km || 
|-id=414 bgcolor=#E9E9E9
| 204414 ||  || — || November 4, 2004 || Kitt Peak || Spacewatch || — || align=right | 1.3 km || 
|-id=415 bgcolor=#E9E9E9
| 204415 ||  || — || November 4, 2004 || Kitt Peak || Spacewatch || — || align=right | 2.9 km || 
|-id=416 bgcolor=#fefefe
| 204416 ||  || — || November 5, 2004 || Campo Imperatore || CINEOS || — || align=right data-sort-value="0.97" | 970 m || 
|-id=417 bgcolor=#fefefe
| 204417 ||  || — || November 4, 2004 || Catalina || CSS || — || align=right | 1.2 km || 
|-id=418 bgcolor=#fefefe
| 204418 ||  || — || November 7, 2004 || Socorro || LINEAR || — || align=right | 1.1 km || 
|-id=419 bgcolor=#fefefe
| 204419 ||  || — || November 5, 2004 || Campo Imperatore || CINEOS || NYS || align=right | 1.0 km || 
|-id=420 bgcolor=#fefefe
| 204420 ||  || — || November 7, 2004 || Socorro || LINEAR || — || align=right | 1.2 km || 
|-id=421 bgcolor=#fefefe
| 204421 ||  || — || November 10, 2004 || Kitt Peak || Spacewatch || — || align=right | 1.1 km || 
|-id=422 bgcolor=#E9E9E9
| 204422 ||  || — || November 10, 2004 || Kitt Peak || Spacewatch || — || align=right | 2.2 km || 
|-id=423 bgcolor=#fefefe
| 204423 ||  || — || November 15, 2004 || Cordell-Lorenz || D. T. Durig || V || align=right data-sort-value="0.92" | 920 m || 
|-id=424 bgcolor=#fefefe
| 204424 ||  || — || November 12, 2004 || Catalina || CSS || NYS || align=right data-sort-value="0.92" | 920 m || 
|-id=425 bgcolor=#fefefe
| 204425 ||  || — || November 17, 2004 || Campo Imperatore || CINEOS || MAS || align=right data-sort-value="0.93" | 930 m || 
|-id=426 bgcolor=#fefefe
| 204426 ||  || — || November 19, 2004 || Socorro || LINEAR || — || align=right | 1.3 km || 
|-id=427 bgcolor=#fefefe
| 204427 ||  || — || December 2, 2004 || Palomar || NEAT || — || align=right | 1.3 km || 
|-id=428 bgcolor=#fefefe
| 204428 ||  || — || December 8, 2004 || Socorro || LINEAR || NYS || align=right | 1.1 km || 
|-id=429 bgcolor=#E9E9E9
| 204429 ||  || — || December 3, 2004 || Kitt Peak || Spacewatch || — || align=right | 2.0 km || 
|-id=430 bgcolor=#fefefe
| 204430 ||  || — || December 8, 2004 || Socorro || LINEAR || — || align=right | 1.4 km || 
|-id=431 bgcolor=#E9E9E9
| 204431 ||  || — || December 10, 2004 || Kitt Peak || Spacewatch || — || align=right | 2.6 km || 
|-id=432 bgcolor=#fefefe
| 204432 ||  || — || December 11, 2004 || Campo Imperatore || CINEOS || — || align=right | 1.7 km || 
|-id=433 bgcolor=#E9E9E9
| 204433 ||  || — || December 11, 2004 || Campo Imperatore || CINEOS || — || align=right | 1.3 km || 
|-id=434 bgcolor=#fefefe
| 204434 ||  || — || December 10, 2004 || Kitt Peak || Spacewatch || — || align=right | 1.4 km || 
|-id=435 bgcolor=#E9E9E9
| 204435 ||  || — || December 11, 2004 || Socorro || LINEAR || — || align=right | 2.8 km || 
|-id=436 bgcolor=#E9E9E9
| 204436 ||  || — || December 11, 2004 || Kitt Peak || Spacewatch || — || align=right | 1.6 km || 
|-id=437 bgcolor=#E9E9E9
| 204437 ||  || — || December 9, 2004 || Jarnac || Jarnac Obs. || — || align=right | 1.6 km || 
|-id=438 bgcolor=#fefefe
| 204438 ||  || — || December 10, 2004 || Socorro || LINEAR || NYS || align=right data-sort-value="0.90" | 900 m || 
|-id=439 bgcolor=#E9E9E9
| 204439 ||  || — || December 10, 2004 || Kitt Peak || Spacewatch || — || align=right | 1.5 km || 
|-id=440 bgcolor=#E9E9E9
| 204440 ||  || — || December 12, 2004 || Catalina || CSS || — || align=right | 2.8 km || 
|-id=441 bgcolor=#E9E9E9
| 204441 ||  || — || December 10, 2004 || Socorro || LINEAR || — || align=right | 1.3 km || 
|-id=442 bgcolor=#E9E9E9
| 204442 ||  || — || December 11, 2004 || Socorro || LINEAR || — || align=right | 4.1 km || 
|-id=443 bgcolor=#fefefe
| 204443 ||  || — || December 11, 2004 || Socorro || LINEAR || — || align=right | 1.6 km || 
|-id=444 bgcolor=#E9E9E9
| 204444 ||  || — || December 11, 2004 || Socorro || LINEAR || — || align=right | 3.9 km || 
|-id=445 bgcolor=#E9E9E9
| 204445 ||  || — || December 12, 2004 || Kitt Peak || Spacewatch || HEN || align=right | 1.5 km || 
|-id=446 bgcolor=#E9E9E9
| 204446 ||  || — || December 12, 2004 || Kitt Peak || Spacewatch || — || align=right | 1.3 km || 
|-id=447 bgcolor=#E9E9E9
| 204447 ||  || — || December 9, 2004 || Kitt Peak || Spacewatch || — || align=right | 1.4 km || 
|-id=448 bgcolor=#fefefe
| 204448 ||  || — || December 10, 2004 || Socorro || LINEAR || NYS || align=right | 1.1 km || 
|-id=449 bgcolor=#fefefe
| 204449 ||  || — || December 11, 2004 || Socorro || LINEAR || PHO || align=right | 1.7 km || 
|-id=450 bgcolor=#E9E9E9
| 204450 ||  || — || December 15, 2004 || Socorro || LINEAR || — || align=right | 3.2 km || 
|-id=451 bgcolor=#E9E9E9
| 204451 ||  || — || December 13, 2004 || Kitt Peak || Spacewatch || WIT || align=right | 1.7 km || 
|-id=452 bgcolor=#fefefe
| 204452 ||  || — || December 9, 2004 || Kitt Peak || Spacewatch || NYS || align=right data-sort-value="0.96" | 960 m || 
|-id=453 bgcolor=#fefefe
| 204453 ||  || — || December 15, 2004 || Kitt Peak || Spacewatch || — || align=right | 1.2 km || 
|-id=454 bgcolor=#E9E9E9
| 204454 ||  || — || December 10, 2004 || Kitt Peak || Spacewatch || — || align=right | 3.7 km || 
|-id=455 bgcolor=#fefefe
| 204455 ||  || — || December 18, 2004 || Mount Lemmon || Mount Lemmon Survey || — || align=right | 1.4 km || 
|-id=456 bgcolor=#fefefe
| 204456 ||  || — || December 18, 2004 || Mount Lemmon || Mount Lemmon Survey || MAS || align=right | 1.2 km || 
|-id=457 bgcolor=#fefefe
| 204457 ||  || — || December 18, 2004 || Mount Lemmon || Mount Lemmon Survey || MAS || align=right | 2.0 km || 
|-id=458 bgcolor=#E9E9E9
| 204458 ||  || — || December 18, 2004 || Mount Lemmon || Mount Lemmon Survey || GAL || align=right | 3.5 km || 
|-id=459 bgcolor=#E9E9E9
| 204459 ||  || — || December 18, 2004 || Mount Lemmon || Mount Lemmon Survey || — || align=right | 2.1 km || 
|-id=460 bgcolor=#E9E9E9
| 204460 ||  || — || December 18, 2004 || Mount Lemmon || Mount Lemmon Survey || — || align=right | 1.5 km || 
|-id=461 bgcolor=#E9E9E9
| 204461 ||  || — || December 18, 2004 || Mount Lemmon || Mount Lemmon Survey || — || align=right | 3.9 km || 
|-id=462 bgcolor=#E9E9E9
| 204462 ||  || — || December 16, 2004 || Kitt Peak || Spacewatch || — || align=right | 1.9 km || 
|-id=463 bgcolor=#E9E9E9
| 204463 ||  || — || January 7, 2005 || Socorro || LINEAR || — || align=right | 2.6 km || 
|-id=464 bgcolor=#E9E9E9
| 204464 ||  || — || January 8, 2005 || Socorro || LINEAR || — || align=right | 1.9 km || 
|-id=465 bgcolor=#fefefe
| 204465 ||  || — || January 6, 2005 || Socorro || LINEAR || — || align=right | 1.4 km || 
|-id=466 bgcolor=#E9E9E9
| 204466 ||  || — || January 6, 2005 || Socorro || LINEAR || — || align=right | 2.0 km || 
|-id=467 bgcolor=#E9E9E9
| 204467 ||  || — || January 7, 2005 || Catalina || CSS || — || align=right | 3.5 km || 
|-id=468 bgcolor=#E9E9E9
| 204468 ||  || — || January 8, 2005 || Campo Imperatore || CINEOS || — || align=right | 1.4 km || 
|-id=469 bgcolor=#E9E9E9
| 204469 ||  || — || January 11, 2005 || Socorro || LINEAR || — || align=right | 1.8 km || 
|-id=470 bgcolor=#fefefe
| 204470 ||  || — || January 13, 2005 || Catalina || CSS || — || align=right | 1.5 km || 
|-id=471 bgcolor=#E9E9E9
| 204471 ||  || — || January 11, 2005 || Socorro || LINEAR || — || align=right | 2.3 km || 
|-id=472 bgcolor=#E9E9E9
| 204472 ||  || — || January 11, 2005 || Socorro || LINEAR || — || align=right | 2.3 km || 
|-id=473 bgcolor=#E9E9E9
| 204473 ||  || — || January 13, 2005 || Socorro || LINEAR || — || align=right | 4.4 km || 
|-id=474 bgcolor=#E9E9E9
| 204474 ||  || — || January 13, 2005 || Catalina || CSS || MAR || align=right | 1.5 km || 
|-id=475 bgcolor=#E9E9E9
| 204475 ||  || — || January 15, 2005 || Socorro || LINEAR || — || align=right | 2.5 km || 
|-id=476 bgcolor=#E9E9E9
| 204476 ||  || — || January 13, 2005 || Kitt Peak || Spacewatch || AEO || align=right | 1.3 km || 
|-id=477 bgcolor=#fefefe
| 204477 ||  || — || January 13, 2005 || Kitt Peak || Spacewatch || — || align=right | 1.7 km || 
|-id=478 bgcolor=#E9E9E9
| 204478 ||  || — || January 15, 2005 || Catalina || CSS || HNS || align=right | 2.5 km || 
|-id=479 bgcolor=#E9E9E9
| 204479 ||  || — || January 15, 2005 || Socorro || LINEAR || — || align=right | 1.9 km || 
|-id=480 bgcolor=#E9E9E9
| 204480 ||  || — || January 15, 2005 || Catalina || CSS || KRM || align=right | 3.6 km || 
|-id=481 bgcolor=#E9E9E9
| 204481 ||  || — || January 15, 2005 || Kitt Peak || Spacewatch || MRX || align=right | 1.5 km || 
|-id=482 bgcolor=#E9E9E9
| 204482 ||  || — || January 13, 2005 || RAS || A. Lowe || — || align=right | 2.0 km || 
|-id=483 bgcolor=#E9E9E9
| 204483 ||  || — || January 13, 2005 || Kitt Peak || Spacewatch || CLO || align=right | 3.5 km || 
|-id=484 bgcolor=#E9E9E9
| 204484 ||  || — || January 15, 2005 || Anderson Mesa || LONEOS || — || align=right | 2.4 km || 
|-id=485 bgcolor=#E9E9E9
| 204485 ||  || — || January 15, 2005 || Kitt Peak || Spacewatch || — || align=right | 2.0 km || 
|-id=486 bgcolor=#E9E9E9
| 204486 ||  || — || January 15, 2005 || Kitt Peak || Spacewatch || HEN || align=right | 1.5 km || 
|-id=487 bgcolor=#E9E9E9
| 204487 ||  || — || January 16, 2005 || Kitt Peak || Spacewatch || — || align=right | 1.4 km || 
|-id=488 bgcolor=#fefefe
| 204488 ||  || — || January 16, 2005 || Socorro || LINEAR || NYS || align=right | 1.2 km || 
|-id=489 bgcolor=#E9E9E9
| 204489 ||  || — || January 17, 2005 || Kitt Peak || Spacewatch || ADE || align=right | 2.7 km || 
|-id=490 bgcolor=#E9E9E9
| 204490 ||  || — || January 16, 2005 || Kitt Peak || Spacewatch || MIS || align=right | 3.4 km || 
|-id=491 bgcolor=#E9E9E9
| 204491 ||  || — || January 31, 2005 || Palomar || NEAT || — || align=right | 1.6 km || 
|-id=492 bgcolor=#E9E9E9
| 204492 ||  || — || January 31, 2005 || Goodricke-Pigott || R. A. Tucker || — || align=right | 1.9 km || 
|-id=493 bgcolor=#E9E9E9
| 204493 ||  || — || February 1, 2005 || Catalina || CSS || — || align=right | 2.2 km || 
|-id=494 bgcolor=#fefefe
| 204494 ||  || — || February 1, 2005 || Catalina || CSS || — || align=right | 1.3 km || 
|-id=495 bgcolor=#E9E9E9
| 204495 ||  || — || February 1, 2005 || Catalina || CSS || — || align=right | 2.2 km || 
|-id=496 bgcolor=#fefefe
| 204496 ||  || — || February 1, 2005 || Kitt Peak || Spacewatch || — || align=right | 1.8 km || 
|-id=497 bgcolor=#E9E9E9
| 204497 ||  || — || February 2, 2005 || Socorro || LINEAR || RAF || align=right | 1.6 km || 
|-id=498 bgcolor=#E9E9E9
| 204498 ||  || — || February 2, 2005 || Catalina || CSS || — || align=right | 2.6 km || 
|-id=499 bgcolor=#E9E9E9
| 204499 ||  || — || February 1, 2005 || Kitt Peak || Spacewatch || — || align=right | 2.2 km || 
|-id=500 bgcolor=#E9E9E9
| 204500 ||  || — || February 2, 2005 || Socorro || LINEAR || — || align=right | 2.2 km || 
|}

204501–204600 

|-bgcolor=#E9E9E9
| 204501 ||  || — || February 1, 2005 || Kitt Peak || Spacewatch || — || align=right | 2.0 km || 
|-id=502 bgcolor=#E9E9E9
| 204502 ||  || — || February 3, 2005 || Socorro || LINEAR || NEM || align=right | 3.0 km || 
|-id=503 bgcolor=#E9E9E9
| 204503 ||  || — || February 6, 2005 || Palomar || NEAT || — || align=right | 2.6 km || 
|-id=504 bgcolor=#E9E9E9
| 204504 ||  || — || February 2, 2005 || Kitt Peak || Spacewatch || — || align=right | 2.0 km || 
|-id=505 bgcolor=#E9E9E9
| 204505 ||  || — || February 2, 2005 || Kitt Peak || Spacewatch || — || align=right | 1.4 km || 
|-id=506 bgcolor=#E9E9E9
| 204506 ||  || — || February 9, 2005 || Socorro || LINEAR || — || align=right | 2.6 km || 
|-id=507 bgcolor=#E9E9E9
| 204507 ||  || — || February 9, 2005 || Mount Lemmon || Mount Lemmon Survey || — || align=right | 2.4 km || 
|-id=508 bgcolor=#E9E9E9
| 204508 ||  || — || February 1, 2005 || Kitt Peak || Spacewatch || EUN || align=right | 1.6 km || 
|-id=509 bgcolor=#E9E9E9
| 204509 ||  || — || February 1, 2005 || Kitt Peak || Spacewatch || NEM || align=right | 2.9 km || 
|-id=510 bgcolor=#d6d6d6
| 204510 ||  || — || February 4, 2005 || Mount Lemmon || Mount Lemmon Survey || — || align=right | 3.8 km || 
|-id=511 bgcolor=#E9E9E9
| 204511 ||  || — || February 1, 2005 || Catalina || CSS || — || align=right | 4.5 km || 
|-id=512 bgcolor=#d6d6d6
| 204512 ||  || — || March 2, 2005 || Great Shefford || P. Birtwhistle || 628 || align=right | 3.0 km || 
|-id=513 bgcolor=#E9E9E9
| 204513 ||  || — || March 1, 2005 || Kitt Peak || Spacewatch || — || align=right | 3.1 km || 
|-id=514 bgcolor=#E9E9E9
| 204514 ||  || — || March 3, 2005 || Kitt Peak || Spacewatch || — || align=right | 2.1 km || 
|-id=515 bgcolor=#d6d6d6
| 204515 ||  || — || March 3, 2005 || Kitt Peak || Spacewatch || KOR || align=right | 2.0 km || 
|-id=516 bgcolor=#E9E9E9
| 204516 ||  || — || March 3, 2005 || Catalina || CSS || VIB || align=right | 3.2 km || 
|-id=517 bgcolor=#FA8072
| 204517 ||  || — || March 3, 2005 || Catalina || CSS || — || align=right | 2.0 km || 
|-id=518 bgcolor=#d6d6d6
| 204518 ||  || — || March 3, 2005 || Catalina || CSS || KOR || align=right | 2.5 km || 
|-id=519 bgcolor=#d6d6d6
| 204519 ||  || — || March 3, 2005 || Catalina || CSS || BRA || align=right | 2.7 km || 
|-id=520 bgcolor=#E9E9E9
| 204520 ||  || — || March 3, 2005 || Catalina || CSS || — || align=right | 4.0 km || 
|-id=521 bgcolor=#E9E9E9
| 204521 ||  || — || March 3, 2005 || Catalina || CSS || — || align=right | 2.6 km || 
|-id=522 bgcolor=#E9E9E9
| 204522 ||  || — || March 4, 2005 || Kitt Peak || Spacewatch || — || align=right | 1.3 km || 
|-id=523 bgcolor=#E9E9E9
| 204523 ||  || — || March 4, 2005 || Catalina || CSS || JUN || align=right | 1.6 km || 
|-id=524 bgcolor=#E9E9E9
| 204524 ||  || — || March 3, 2005 || Catalina || CSS || — || align=right | 2.9 km || 
|-id=525 bgcolor=#E9E9E9
| 204525 ||  || — || March 3, 2005 || Catalina || CSS || — || align=right | 4.2 km || 
|-id=526 bgcolor=#E9E9E9
| 204526 ||  || — || March 4, 2005 || Socorro || LINEAR || — || align=right | 2.2 km || 
|-id=527 bgcolor=#E9E9E9
| 204527 ||  || — || March 4, 2005 || Socorro || LINEAR || AGN || align=right | 2.3 km || 
|-id=528 bgcolor=#d6d6d6
| 204528 ||  || — || March 4, 2005 || Mount Lemmon || Mount Lemmon Survey || KOR || align=right | 2.1 km || 
|-id=529 bgcolor=#E9E9E9
| 204529 ||  || — || March 8, 2005 || Anderson Mesa || LONEOS || — || align=right | 3.2 km || 
|-id=530 bgcolor=#d6d6d6
| 204530 ||  || — || March 3, 2005 || Catalina || CSS || HYG || align=right | 5.3 km || 
|-id=531 bgcolor=#E9E9E9
| 204531 ||  || — || March 4, 2005 || Kitt Peak || Spacewatch || AGN || align=right | 1.7 km || 
|-id=532 bgcolor=#E9E9E9
| 204532 ||  || — || March 4, 2005 || Catalina || CSS || DOR || align=right | 4.9 km || 
|-id=533 bgcolor=#d6d6d6
| 204533 ||  || — || March 4, 2005 || Socorro || LINEAR || HYG || align=right | 4.7 km || 
|-id=534 bgcolor=#E9E9E9
| 204534 ||  || — || March 7, 2005 || Socorro || LINEAR || — || align=right | 1.8 km || 
|-id=535 bgcolor=#E9E9E9
| 204535 ||  || — || March 9, 2005 || Anderson Mesa || LONEOS || — || align=right | 3.7 km || 
|-id=536 bgcolor=#d6d6d6
| 204536 ||  || — || March 9, 2005 || Mount Lemmon || Mount Lemmon Survey || — || align=right | 3.6 km || 
|-id=537 bgcolor=#E9E9E9
| 204537 ||  || — || March 10, 2005 || Mount Lemmon || Mount Lemmon Survey || — || align=right | 1.8 km || 
|-id=538 bgcolor=#d6d6d6
| 204538 ||  || — || March 10, 2005 || Mount Lemmon || Mount Lemmon Survey || — || align=right | 3.9 km || 
|-id=539 bgcolor=#E9E9E9
| 204539 ||  || — || March 10, 2005 || Mount Lemmon || Mount Lemmon Survey || — || align=right | 4.0 km || 
|-id=540 bgcolor=#d6d6d6
| 204540 ||  || — || March 9, 2005 || Mount Lemmon || Mount Lemmon Survey || — || align=right | 2.4 km || 
|-id=541 bgcolor=#d6d6d6
| 204541 ||  || — || March 11, 2005 || Kitt Peak || Spacewatch || — || align=right | 3.9 km || 
|-id=542 bgcolor=#E9E9E9
| 204542 ||  || — || March 7, 2005 || Socorro || LINEAR || — || align=right | 2.2 km || 
|-id=543 bgcolor=#E9E9E9
| 204543 ||  || — || March 9, 2005 || Socorro || LINEAR || — || align=right | 3.2 km || 
|-id=544 bgcolor=#d6d6d6
| 204544 ||  || — || March 9, 2005 || Mount Lemmon || Mount Lemmon Survey || — || align=right | 4.2 km || 
|-id=545 bgcolor=#E9E9E9
| 204545 ||  || — || March 10, 2005 || Mount Lemmon || Mount Lemmon Survey || fast? || align=right | 3.2 km || 
|-id=546 bgcolor=#E9E9E9
| 204546 ||  || — || March 10, 2005 || Mount Lemmon || Mount Lemmon Survey || — || align=right | 2.2 km || 
|-id=547 bgcolor=#E9E9E9
| 204547 ||  || — || March 10, 2005 || Mount Lemmon || Mount Lemmon Survey || — || align=right | 2.4 km || 
|-id=548 bgcolor=#E9E9E9
| 204548 ||  || — || March 11, 2005 || Anderson Mesa || LONEOS || — || align=right | 1.4 km || 
|-id=549 bgcolor=#E9E9E9
| 204549 ||  || — || March 11, 2005 || Mount Lemmon || Mount Lemmon Survey || — || align=right | 1.8 km || 
|-id=550 bgcolor=#d6d6d6
| 204550 ||  || — || March 11, 2005 || Mount Lemmon || Mount Lemmon Survey || KOR || align=right | 1.9 km || 
|-id=551 bgcolor=#d6d6d6
| 204551 ||  || — || March 11, 2005 || Mount Lemmon || Mount Lemmon Survey || — || align=right | 3.0 km || 
|-id=552 bgcolor=#d6d6d6
| 204552 ||  || — || March 11, 2005 || Mount Lemmon || Mount Lemmon Survey || KOR || align=right | 1.8 km || 
|-id=553 bgcolor=#d6d6d6
| 204553 ||  || — || March 9, 2005 || Kitt Peak || Spacewatch || HYG || align=right | 5.6 km || 
|-id=554 bgcolor=#E9E9E9
| 204554 ||  || — || March 8, 2005 || Socorro || LINEAR || — || align=right | 3.0 km || 
|-id=555 bgcolor=#E9E9E9
| 204555 ||  || — || March 14, 2005 || Mount Lemmon || Mount Lemmon Survey || — || align=right | 1.7 km || 
|-id=556 bgcolor=#E9E9E9
| 204556 ||  || — || March 12, 2005 || Socorro || LINEAR || — || align=right | 3.8 km || 
|-id=557 bgcolor=#E9E9E9
| 204557 ||  || — || March 13, 2005 || Kitt Peak || Spacewatch || — || align=right | 1.6 km || 
|-id=558 bgcolor=#d6d6d6
| 204558 ||  || — || March 13, 2005 || Kitt Peak || Spacewatch || — || align=right | 3.4 km || 
|-id=559 bgcolor=#d6d6d6
| 204559 ||  || — || March 13, 2005 || Kitt Peak || Spacewatch || — || align=right | 3.9 km || 
|-id=560 bgcolor=#E9E9E9
| 204560 ||  || — || March 8, 2005 || Anderson Mesa || LONEOS || — || align=right | 1.9 km || 
|-id=561 bgcolor=#d6d6d6
| 204561 ||  || — || March 8, 2005 || Mount Lemmon || Mount Lemmon Survey || — || align=right | 4.4 km || 
|-id=562 bgcolor=#E9E9E9
| 204562 ||  || — || March 9, 2005 || Catalina || CSS || — || align=right | 3.0 km || 
|-id=563 bgcolor=#E9E9E9
| 204563 ||  || — || March 10, 2005 || Anderson Mesa || LONEOS || — || align=right | 4.0 km || 
|-id=564 bgcolor=#d6d6d6
| 204564 ||  || — || March 10, 2005 || Catalina || CSS || — || align=right | 2.9 km || 
|-id=565 bgcolor=#d6d6d6
| 204565 ||  || — || March 9, 2005 || Mount Lemmon || Mount Lemmon Survey || KOR || align=right | 2.1 km || 
|-id=566 bgcolor=#d6d6d6
| 204566 ||  || — || March 11, 2005 || Kitt Peak || M. W. Buie || — || align=right | 2.6 km || 
|-id=567 bgcolor=#d6d6d6
| 204567 ||  || — || March 11, 2005 || Kitt Peak || M. W. Buie || — || align=right | 3.6 km || 
|-id=568 bgcolor=#d6d6d6
| 204568 ||  || — || March 9, 2005 || Mount Lemmon || Mount Lemmon Survey || — || align=right | 3.0 km || 
|-id=569 bgcolor=#d6d6d6
| 204569 ||  || — || March 10, 2005 || Mount Lemmon || Mount Lemmon Survey || — || align=right | 3.7 km || 
|-id=570 bgcolor=#E9E9E9
| 204570 ||  || — || March 12, 2005 || Kitt Peak || M. W. Buie || — || align=right | 3.6 km || 
|-id=571 bgcolor=#E9E9E9
| 204571 ||  || — || March 9, 2005 || Calvin-Rehoboth || Calvin–Rehoboth Obs. || — || align=right | 1.4 km || 
|-id=572 bgcolor=#d6d6d6
| 204572 ||  || — || March 1, 2005 || Kitt Peak || Spacewatch || — || align=right | 3.4 km || 
|-id=573 bgcolor=#d6d6d6
| 204573 ||  || — || March 12, 2005 || Kitt Peak || Spacewatch || — || align=right | 3.6 km || 
|-id=574 bgcolor=#d6d6d6
| 204574 ||  || — || March 18, 2005 || Socorro || LINEAR || — || align=right | 2.9 km || 
|-id=575 bgcolor=#E9E9E9
| 204575 ||  || — || March 30, 2005 || Catalina || CSS || — || align=right | 3.4 km || 
|-id=576 bgcolor=#E9E9E9
| 204576 ||  || — || April 3, 2005 || Kleť || Kleť Obs. || — || align=right | 4.2 km || 
|-id=577 bgcolor=#d6d6d6
| 204577 ||  || — || April 1, 2005 || Anderson Mesa || LONEOS || — || align=right | 3.9 km || 
|-id=578 bgcolor=#E9E9E9
| 204578 ||  || — || April 1, 2005 || Anderson Mesa || LONEOS || — || align=right | 3.9 km || 
|-id=579 bgcolor=#d6d6d6
| 204579 ||  || — || April 1, 2005 || Anderson Mesa || LONEOS || — || align=right | 3.9 km || 
|-id=580 bgcolor=#E9E9E9
| 204580 ||  || — || April 3, 2005 || Palomar || NEAT || — || align=right | 3.0 km || 
|-id=581 bgcolor=#E9E9E9
| 204581 ||  || — || April 2, 2005 || Anderson Mesa || LONEOS || — || align=right | 1.7 km || 
|-id=582 bgcolor=#d6d6d6
| 204582 ||  || — || April 5, 2005 || Palomar || NEAT || EOS || align=right | 3.1 km || 
|-id=583 bgcolor=#d6d6d6
| 204583 ||  || — || April 5, 2005 || Anderson Mesa || LONEOS || HYG || align=right | 3.5 km || 
|-id=584 bgcolor=#d6d6d6
| 204584 ||  || — || April 5, 2005 || Mount Lemmon || Mount Lemmon Survey || KOR || align=right | 1.8 km || 
|-id=585 bgcolor=#E9E9E9
| 204585 ||  || — || April 6, 2005 || Mount Lemmon || Mount Lemmon Survey || — || align=right | 1.5 km || 
|-id=586 bgcolor=#d6d6d6
| 204586 ||  || — || April 1, 2005 || Kitt Peak || Spacewatch || — || align=right | 4.2 km || 
|-id=587 bgcolor=#d6d6d6
| 204587 ||  || — || April 2, 2005 || Mount Lemmon || Mount Lemmon Survey || KOR || align=right | 2.0 km || 
|-id=588 bgcolor=#d6d6d6
| 204588 ||  || — || April 4, 2005 || Kitt Peak || Spacewatch || — || align=right | 3.5 km || 
|-id=589 bgcolor=#d6d6d6
| 204589 ||  || — || April 4, 2005 || Catalina || CSS || THB || align=right | 5.8 km || 
|-id=590 bgcolor=#E9E9E9
| 204590 ||  || — || April 6, 2005 || Campo Imperatore || CINEOS || — || align=right | 4.1 km || 
|-id=591 bgcolor=#E9E9E9
| 204591 ||  || — || April 9, 2005 || Siding Spring || SSS || — || align=right | 2.4 km || 
|-id=592 bgcolor=#d6d6d6
| 204592 ||  || — || April 10, 2005 || Mount Lemmon || Mount Lemmon Survey || KOR || align=right | 1.5 km || 
|-id=593 bgcolor=#d6d6d6
| 204593 ||  || — || April 8, 2005 || Socorro || LINEAR || — || align=right | 4.4 km || 
|-id=594 bgcolor=#E9E9E9
| 204594 ||  || — || April 8, 2005 || Socorro || LINEAR || — || align=right | 4.2 km || 
|-id=595 bgcolor=#E9E9E9
| 204595 ||  || — || April 6, 2005 || Mount Lemmon || Mount Lemmon Survey || — || align=right | 2.1 km || 
|-id=596 bgcolor=#d6d6d6
| 204596 ||  || — || April 10, 2005 || Kitt Peak || Spacewatch || HYG || align=right | 4.7 km || 
|-id=597 bgcolor=#d6d6d6
| 204597 ||  || — || April 11, 2005 || Kitt Peak || Spacewatch || — || align=right | 2.9 km || 
|-id=598 bgcolor=#E9E9E9
| 204598 ||  || — || April 11, 2005 || Socorro || LINEAR || — || align=right | 2.4 km || 
|-id=599 bgcolor=#d6d6d6
| 204599 ||  || — || April 12, 2005 || Kitt Peak || Spacewatch || KOR || align=right | 2.4 km || 
|-id=600 bgcolor=#d6d6d6
| 204600 ||  || — || April 12, 2005 || Mount Lemmon || Mount Lemmon Survey || — || align=right | 3.6 km || 
|}

204601–204700 

|-bgcolor=#E9E9E9
| 204601 ||  || — || April 13, 2005 || Catalina || CSS || — || align=right | 3.5 km || 
|-id=602 bgcolor=#d6d6d6
| 204602 ||  || — || April 11, 2005 || Kitt Peak || M. W. Buie || KAR || align=right | 1.5 km || 
|-id=603 bgcolor=#d6d6d6
| 204603 ||  || — || May 2, 2005 || Kitt Peak || Spacewatch || — || align=right | 4.7 km || 
|-id=604 bgcolor=#d6d6d6
| 204604 ||  || — || May 4, 2005 || Kitt Peak || Spacewatch || — || align=right | 3.9 km || 
|-id=605 bgcolor=#E9E9E9
| 204605 ||  || — || May 1, 2005 || Palomar || NEAT || XIZ || align=right | 2.2 km || 
|-id=606 bgcolor=#d6d6d6
| 204606 ||  || — || May 4, 2005 || Mount Lemmon || Mount Lemmon Survey || — || align=right | 3.2 km || 
|-id=607 bgcolor=#d6d6d6
| 204607 ||  || — || May 3, 2005 || Kitt Peak || Spacewatch || — || align=right | 4.8 km || 
|-id=608 bgcolor=#d6d6d6
| 204608 ||  || — || May 8, 2005 || Mount Lemmon || Mount Lemmon Survey || — || align=right | 2.6 km || 
|-id=609 bgcolor=#d6d6d6
| 204609 ||  || — || May 3, 2005 || Kitt Peak || Spacewatch || — || align=right | 2.8 km || 
|-id=610 bgcolor=#d6d6d6
| 204610 ||  || — || May 8, 2005 || Kitt Peak || Spacewatch || — || align=right | 6.0 km || 
|-id=611 bgcolor=#d6d6d6
| 204611 ||  || — || May 11, 2005 || Cordell-Lorenz || D. T. Durig || — || align=right | 4.1 km || 
|-id=612 bgcolor=#d6d6d6
| 204612 ||  || — || May 11, 2005 || Anderson Mesa || LONEOS || — || align=right | 5.7 km || 
|-id=613 bgcolor=#d6d6d6
| 204613 ||  || — || May 13, 2005 || Mount Lemmon || Mount Lemmon Survey || — || align=right | 4.7 km || 
|-id=614 bgcolor=#d6d6d6
| 204614 ||  || — || May 13, 2005 || Mount Lemmon || Mount Lemmon Survey || — || align=right | 3.9 km || 
|-id=615 bgcolor=#d6d6d6
| 204615 ||  || — || May 4, 2005 || Mount Lemmon || Mount Lemmon Survey || — || align=right | 3.3 km || 
|-id=616 bgcolor=#d6d6d6
| 204616 ||  || — || May 31, 2005 || Catalina || CSS || TIR || align=right | 4.9 km || 
|-id=617 bgcolor=#d6d6d6
| 204617 ||  || — || June 1, 2005 || Kitt Peak || Spacewatch || EOS || align=right | 2.8 km || 
|-id=618 bgcolor=#d6d6d6
| 204618 ||  || — || June 3, 2005 || Kitt Peak || Spacewatch || — || align=right | 4.1 km || 
|-id=619 bgcolor=#C2FFFF
| 204619 ||  || — || June 13, 2005 || Bergisch Gladbach || W. Bickel || L4 || align=right | 15 km || 
|-id=620 bgcolor=#d6d6d6
| 204620 ||  || — || June 11, 2005 || Kitt Peak || Spacewatch || — || align=right | 4.8 km || 
|-id=621 bgcolor=#d6d6d6
| 204621 ||  || — || June 11, 2005 || Catalina || CSS || ALA || align=right | 5.3 km || 
|-id=622 bgcolor=#d6d6d6
| 204622 ||  || — || June 27, 2005 || Kitt Peak || Spacewatch || 3:2 || align=right | 6.1 km || 
|-id=623 bgcolor=#d6d6d6
| 204623 ||  || — || June 24, 2005 || Palomar || NEAT || — || align=right | 4.8 km || 
|-id=624 bgcolor=#fefefe
| 204624 ||  || — || August 1, 2005 || Siding Spring || SSS || H || align=right | 1.2 km || 
|-id=625 bgcolor=#FA8072
| 204625 ||  || — || September 15, 2005 || Catalina || CSS || H || align=right data-sort-value="0.95" | 950 m || 
|-id=626 bgcolor=#fefefe
| 204626 ||  || — || September 26, 2005 || Socorro || LINEAR || H || align=right data-sort-value="0.87" | 870 m || 
|-id=627 bgcolor=#FA8072
| 204627 ||  || — || November 21, 2005 || Kitt Peak || Spacewatch || — || align=right | 1.4 km || 
|-id=628 bgcolor=#fefefe
| 204628 ||  || — || November 29, 2005 || Mount Lemmon || Mount Lemmon Survey || — || align=right data-sort-value="0.80" | 800 m || 
|-id=629 bgcolor=#fefefe
| 204629 ||  || — || December 4, 2005 || Kitt Peak || Spacewatch || FLO || align=right | 1.4 km || 
|-id=630 bgcolor=#E9E9E9
| 204630 ||  || — || December 1, 2005 || Kitt Peak || Spacewatch || — || align=right | 2.3 km || 
|-id=631 bgcolor=#fefefe
| 204631 ||  || — || December 6, 2005 || Kitt Peak || Spacewatch || — || align=right | 1.0 km || 
|-id=632 bgcolor=#fefefe
| 204632 ||  || — || December 1, 2005 || Kitt Peak || M. W. Buie || MAS || align=right data-sort-value="0.96" | 960 m || 
|-id=633 bgcolor=#fefefe
| 204633 ||  || — || December 25, 2005 || Kitt Peak || Spacewatch || — || align=right data-sort-value="0.94" | 940 m || 
|-id=634 bgcolor=#fefefe
| 204634 ||  || — || December 24, 2005 || Kitt Peak || Spacewatch || FLO || align=right data-sort-value="0.71" | 710 m || 
|-id=635 bgcolor=#fefefe
| 204635 ||  || — || December 25, 2005 || Mount Lemmon || Mount Lemmon Survey || — || align=right data-sort-value="0.80" | 800 m || 
|-id=636 bgcolor=#fefefe
| 204636 ||  || — || December 24, 2005 || Kitt Peak || Spacewatch || — || align=right | 1.1 km || 
|-id=637 bgcolor=#fefefe
| 204637 ||  || — || December 29, 2005 || Catalina || CSS || — || align=right | 1.5 km || 
|-id=638 bgcolor=#fefefe
| 204638 ||  || — || January 2, 2006 || Catalina || CSS || — || align=right | 1.1 km || 
|-id=639 bgcolor=#fefefe
| 204639 ||  || — || January 5, 2006 || Kitt Peak || Spacewatch || — || align=right | 1.7 km || 
|-id=640 bgcolor=#fefefe
| 204640 ||  || — || January 5, 2006 || Catalina || CSS || — || align=right | 1.3 km || 
|-id=641 bgcolor=#fefefe
| 204641 ||  || — || January 9, 2006 || Mount Lemmon || Mount Lemmon Survey || — || align=right | 1.3 km || 
|-id=642 bgcolor=#fefefe
| 204642 ||  || — || January 8, 2006 || Kitt Peak || Spacewatch || MAS || align=right | 2.2 km || 
|-id=643 bgcolor=#fefefe
| 204643 ||  || — || January 22, 2006 || Anderson Mesa || LONEOS || — || align=right | 1.1 km || 
|-id=644 bgcolor=#fefefe
| 204644 ||  || — || January 20, 2006 || Kitt Peak || Spacewatch || FLO || align=right | 1.2 km || 
|-id=645 bgcolor=#fefefe
| 204645 ||  || — || January 23, 2006 || Kitt Peak || Spacewatch || — || align=right | 1.2 km || 
|-id=646 bgcolor=#fefefe
| 204646 ||  || — || January 25, 2006 || Kitt Peak || Spacewatch || MAS || align=right data-sort-value="0.86" | 860 m || 
|-id=647 bgcolor=#fefefe
| 204647 ||  || — || January 23, 2006 || Mount Lemmon || Mount Lemmon Survey || — || align=right | 1.3 km || 
|-id=648 bgcolor=#fefefe
| 204648 ||  || — || January 22, 2006 || Mount Lemmon || Mount Lemmon Survey || — || align=right data-sort-value="0.98" | 980 m || 
|-id=649 bgcolor=#fefefe
| 204649 ||  || — || January 23, 2006 || Kitt Peak || Spacewatch || V || align=right data-sort-value="0.90" | 900 m || 
|-id=650 bgcolor=#fefefe
| 204650 ||  || — || January 29, 2006 || Jarnac || Jarnac Obs. || — || align=right | 1.2 km || 
|-id=651 bgcolor=#fefefe
| 204651 ||  || — || January 26, 2006 || Kitt Peak || Spacewatch || — || align=right | 1.4 km || 
|-id=652 bgcolor=#E9E9E9
| 204652 ||  || — || January 26, 2006 || Kitt Peak || Spacewatch || — || align=right | 1.9 km || 
|-id=653 bgcolor=#E9E9E9
| 204653 ||  || — || January 25, 2006 || Kitt Peak || Spacewatch || — || align=right | 1.8 km || 
|-id=654 bgcolor=#fefefe
| 204654 ||  || — || January 26, 2006 || Kitt Peak || Spacewatch || FLO || align=right data-sort-value="0.89" | 890 m || 
|-id=655 bgcolor=#fefefe
| 204655 ||  || — || January 30, 2006 || Kitt Peak || Spacewatch || — || align=right data-sort-value="0.87" | 870 m || 
|-id=656 bgcolor=#fefefe
| 204656 ||  || — || January 31, 2006 || Kitt Peak || Spacewatch || MAS || align=right | 1.2 km || 
|-id=657 bgcolor=#fefefe
| 204657 ||  || — || January 31, 2006 || Kitt Peak || Spacewatch || — || align=right | 2.3 km || 
|-id=658 bgcolor=#fefefe
| 204658 ||  || — || January 31, 2006 || Kitt Peak || Spacewatch || — || align=right data-sort-value="0.83" | 830 m || 
|-id=659 bgcolor=#fefefe
| 204659 ||  || — || February 1, 2006 || Kitt Peak || Spacewatch || — || align=right | 1.1 km || 
|-id=660 bgcolor=#fefefe
| 204660 ||  || — || February 1, 2006 || Kitt Peak || Spacewatch || FLO || align=right data-sort-value="0.95" | 950 m || 
|-id=661 bgcolor=#fefefe
| 204661 ||  || — || February 1, 2006 || Kitt Peak || Spacewatch || — || align=right | 1.0 km || 
|-id=662 bgcolor=#fefefe
| 204662 ||  || — || February 1, 2006 || Kitt Peak || Spacewatch || — || align=right | 1.0 km || 
|-id=663 bgcolor=#fefefe
| 204663 ||  || — || February 11, 2006 || Anderson Mesa || LONEOS || — || align=right | 2.3 km || 
|-id=664 bgcolor=#fefefe
| 204664 ||  || — || February 20, 2006 || Catalina || CSS || — || align=right | 1.1 km || 
|-id=665 bgcolor=#fefefe
| 204665 ||  || — || February 20, 2006 || Catalina || CSS || — || align=right data-sort-value="0.91" | 910 m || 
|-id=666 bgcolor=#fefefe
| 204666 ||  || — || February 20, 2006 || Catalina || CSS || — || align=right | 1.1 km || 
|-id=667 bgcolor=#E9E9E9
| 204667 ||  || — || February 21, 2006 || Catalina || CSS || — || align=right | 2.6 km || 
|-id=668 bgcolor=#E9E9E9
| 204668 ||  || — || February 20, 2006 || Kitt Peak || Spacewatch || — || align=right | 2.1 km || 
|-id=669 bgcolor=#fefefe
| 204669 ||  || — || February 20, 2006 || Catalina || CSS || NYS || align=right data-sort-value="0.97" | 970 m || 
|-id=670 bgcolor=#fefefe
| 204670 ||  || — || February 20, 2006 || Kitt Peak || Spacewatch || — || align=right | 1.1 km || 
|-id=671 bgcolor=#fefefe
| 204671 ||  || — || February 20, 2006 || Mount Lemmon || Mount Lemmon Survey || NYS || align=right | 1.7 km || 
|-id=672 bgcolor=#fefefe
| 204672 ||  || — || February 20, 2006 || Mount Lemmon || Mount Lemmon Survey || MAS || align=right data-sort-value="0.94" | 940 m || 
|-id=673 bgcolor=#fefefe
| 204673 ||  || — || February 20, 2006 || Kitt Peak || Spacewatch || FLO || align=right data-sort-value="0.81" | 810 m || 
|-id=674 bgcolor=#d6d6d6
| 204674 ||  || — || February 24, 2006 || Mount Lemmon || Mount Lemmon Survey || KOR || align=right | 1.9 km || 
|-id=675 bgcolor=#fefefe
| 204675 ||  || — || February 22, 2006 || Catalina || CSS || FLO || align=right data-sort-value="0.90" | 900 m || 
|-id=676 bgcolor=#E9E9E9
| 204676 ||  || — || February 24, 2006 || Kitt Peak || Spacewatch || — || align=right | 2.0 km || 
|-id=677 bgcolor=#E9E9E9
| 204677 ||  || — || February 24, 2006 || Kitt Peak || Spacewatch || — || align=right | 2.0 km || 
|-id=678 bgcolor=#fefefe
| 204678 ||  || — || February 24, 2006 || Kitt Peak || Spacewatch || — || align=right | 1.3 km || 
|-id=679 bgcolor=#fefefe
| 204679 ||  || — || February 24, 2006 || Kitt Peak || Spacewatch || — || align=right | 1.4 km || 
|-id=680 bgcolor=#E9E9E9
| 204680 ||  || — || February 24, 2006 || Kitt Peak || Spacewatch || HEN || align=right | 1.3 km || 
|-id=681 bgcolor=#E9E9E9
| 204681 ||  || — || February 25, 2006 || Kitt Peak || Spacewatch || — || align=right | 2.4 km || 
|-id=682 bgcolor=#fefefe
| 204682 ||  || — || February 27, 2006 || Kitt Peak || Spacewatch || NYS || align=right data-sort-value="0.94" | 940 m || 
|-id=683 bgcolor=#fefefe
| 204683 ||  || — || February 25, 2006 || Kitt Peak || Spacewatch || — || align=right | 2.3 km || 
|-id=684 bgcolor=#fefefe
| 204684 ||  || — || February 27, 2006 || Mount Lemmon || Mount Lemmon Survey || — || align=right | 1.7 km || 
|-id=685 bgcolor=#fefefe
| 204685 ||  || — || February 27, 2006 || Kitt Peak || Spacewatch || NYS || align=right | 1.1 km || 
|-id=686 bgcolor=#fefefe
| 204686 ||  || — || February 27, 2006 || Kitt Peak || Spacewatch || — || align=right | 1.4 km || 
|-id=687 bgcolor=#fefefe
| 204687 ||  || — || February 27, 2006 || Kitt Peak || Spacewatch || NYS || align=right data-sort-value="0.84" | 840 m || 
|-id=688 bgcolor=#fefefe
| 204688 ||  || — || February 23, 2006 || Anderson Mesa || LONEOS || — || align=right | 1.4 km || 
|-id=689 bgcolor=#E9E9E9
| 204689 ||  || — || February 25, 2006 || Kitt Peak || Spacewatch || PAD || align=right | 3.6 km || 
|-id=690 bgcolor=#fefefe
| 204690 ||  || — || February 20, 2006 || Kitt Peak || Spacewatch || — || align=right | 1.3 km || 
|-id=691 bgcolor=#fefefe
| 204691 ||  || — || February 27, 2006 || Mount Lemmon || Mount Lemmon Survey || NYS || align=right data-sort-value="0.92" | 920 m || 
|-id=692 bgcolor=#fefefe
| 204692 || 2006 ET || — || March 4, 2006 || Goodricke-Pigott || R. A. Tucker || — || align=right | 1.4 km || 
|-id=693 bgcolor=#E9E9E9
| 204693 ||  || — || March 2, 2006 || Nyukasa || Mount Nyukasa Stn. || — || align=right | 3.5 km || 
|-id=694 bgcolor=#fefefe
| 204694 ||  || — || March 3, 2006 || Nyukasa || Mount Nyukasa Stn. || — || align=right | 1.6 km || 
|-id=695 bgcolor=#fefefe
| 204695 ||  || — || March 2, 2006 || Kitt Peak || Spacewatch || NYS || align=right data-sort-value="0.91" | 910 m || 
|-id=696 bgcolor=#fefefe
| 204696 ||  || — || March 2, 2006 || Kitt Peak || Spacewatch || MAS || align=right | 1.3 km || 
|-id=697 bgcolor=#E9E9E9
| 204697 ||  || — || March 2, 2006 || Mount Lemmon || Mount Lemmon Survey || — || align=right | 1.4 km || 
|-id=698 bgcolor=#fefefe
| 204698 ||  || — || March 2, 2006 || Mount Lemmon || Mount Lemmon Survey || MAS || align=right data-sort-value="0.87" | 870 m || 
|-id=699 bgcolor=#fefefe
| 204699 ||  || — || March 3, 2006 || Nyukasa || Mount Nyukasa Stn. || NYS || align=right | 1.9 km || 
|-id=700 bgcolor=#E9E9E9
| 204700 ||  || — || March 5, 2006 || Kitt Peak || Spacewatch || — || align=right | 1.8 km || 
|}

204701–204800 

|-bgcolor=#E9E9E9
| 204701 ||  || — || March 5, 2006 || Kitt Peak || Spacewatch || AGN || align=right | 1.4 km || 
|-id=702 bgcolor=#E9E9E9
| 204702 Péquignat ||  ||  || March 19, 2006 || Vicques || M. Ory || DOR || align=right | 3.9 km || 
|-id=703 bgcolor=#fefefe
| 204703 ||  || — || March 24, 2006 || Kitt Peak || Spacewatch || — || align=right | 1.1 km || 
|-id=704 bgcolor=#fefefe
| 204704 ||  || — || March 24, 2006 || Socorro || LINEAR || — || align=right data-sort-value="0.97" | 970 m || 
|-id=705 bgcolor=#d6d6d6
| 204705 ||  || — || March 30, 2006 || Nyukasa || A. Nakanishi, F. Futaba || — || align=right | 5.4 km || 
|-id=706 bgcolor=#fefefe
| 204706 ||  || — || March 23, 2006 || Catalina || CSS || — || align=right | 1.3 km || 
|-id=707 bgcolor=#fefefe
| 204707 ||  || — || March 26, 2006 || Anderson Mesa || LONEOS || V || align=right | 1.3 km || 
|-id=708 bgcolor=#E9E9E9
| 204708 ||  || — || March 26, 2006 || Siding Spring || SSS || MIT || align=right | 4.6 km || 
|-id=709 bgcolor=#E9E9E9
| 204709 ||  || — || March 25, 2006 || Kitt Peak || Spacewatch || — || align=right | 1.4 km || 
|-id=710 bgcolor=#fefefe
| 204710 Gaoxing || 2006 GE ||  || April 1, 2006 || Lulin Observatory || H.-C. Lin, Q.-z. Ye || — || align=right | 1.0 km || 
|-id=711 bgcolor=#E9E9E9
| 204711 Luojialun || 2006 GN ||  || April 1, 2006 || Lulin Observatory || H.-C. Lin, Q.-z. Ye || — || align=right | 2.8 km || 
|-id=712 bgcolor=#fefefe
| 204712 ||  || — || April 2, 2006 || Kitt Peak || Spacewatch || NYS || align=right | 1.0 km || 
|-id=713 bgcolor=#fefefe
| 204713 ||  || — || April 2, 2006 || Kitt Peak || Spacewatch || NYS || align=right data-sort-value="0.90" | 900 m || 
|-id=714 bgcolor=#d6d6d6
| 204714 ||  || — || April 2, 2006 || Kitt Peak || Spacewatch || — || align=right | 2.9 km || 
|-id=715 bgcolor=#fefefe
| 204715 ||  || — || April 2, 2006 || Kitt Peak || Spacewatch || — || align=right data-sort-value="0.91" | 910 m || 
|-id=716 bgcolor=#E9E9E9
| 204716 ||  || — || April 2, 2006 || Kitt Peak || Spacewatch || — || align=right | 2.3 km || 
|-id=717 bgcolor=#E9E9E9
| 204717 ||  || — || April 2, 2006 || Kitt Peak || Spacewatch || AGN || align=right | 1.2 km || 
|-id=718 bgcolor=#E9E9E9
| 204718 ||  || — || April 6, 2006 || Catalina || CSS || EUN || align=right | 2.3 km || 
|-id=719 bgcolor=#fefefe
| 204719 ||  || — || April 6, 2006 || Socorro || LINEAR || FLO || align=right | 1.0 km || 
|-id=720 bgcolor=#fefefe
| 204720 ||  || — || April 7, 2006 || Catalina || CSS || — || align=right | 2.8 km || 
|-id=721 bgcolor=#fefefe
| 204721 ||  || — || April 2, 2006 || Kitt Peak || Spacewatch || NYS || align=right | 1.0 km || 
|-id=722 bgcolor=#fefefe
| 204722 ||  || — || April 18, 2006 || Palomar || NEAT || V || align=right data-sort-value="0.95" | 950 m || 
|-id=723 bgcolor=#fefefe
| 204723 ||  || — || April 18, 2006 || Kitt Peak || Spacewatch || — || align=right | 1.1 km || 
|-id=724 bgcolor=#fefefe
| 204724 ||  || — || April 20, 2006 || Catalina || CSS || — || align=right | 1.7 km || 
|-id=725 bgcolor=#E9E9E9
| 204725 ||  || — || April 19, 2006 || Kitt Peak || Spacewatch || — || align=right | 2.0 km || 
|-id=726 bgcolor=#fefefe
| 204726 ||  || — || April 20, 2006 || Kitt Peak || Spacewatch || NYS || align=right | 1.3 km || 
|-id=727 bgcolor=#E9E9E9
| 204727 ||  || — || April 20, 2006 || Kitt Peak || Spacewatch || — || align=right | 4.2 km || 
|-id=728 bgcolor=#fefefe
| 204728 ||  || — || April 19, 2006 || Catalina || CSS || NYS || align=right | 1.9 km || 
|-id=729 bgcolor=#E9E9E9
| 204729 ||  || — || April 21, 2006 || Catalina || CSS || EUN || align=right | 2.4 km || 
|-id=730 bgcolor=#fefefe
| 204730 ||  || — || April 21, 2006 || Kitt Peak || Spacewatch || PHO || align=right | 1.3 km || 
|-id=731 bgcolor=#E9E9E9
| 204731 ||  || — || April 24, 2006 || Mount Lemmon || Mount Lemmon Survey || — || align=right data-sort-value="0.99" | 990 m || 
|-id=732 bgcolor=#E9E9E9
| 204732 ||  || — || April 25, 2006 || Kitt Peak || Spacewatch || — || align=right | 1.3 km || 
|-id=733 bgcolor=#E9E9E9
| 204733 ||  || — || April 24, 2006 || Kitt Peak || Spacewatch || — || align=right | 1.6 km || 
|-id=734 bgcolor=#fefefe
| 204734 ||  || — || April 24, 2006 || Kitt Peak || Spacewatch || — || align=right | 1.9 km || 
|-id=735 bgcolor=#d6d6d6
| 204735 ||  || — || April 24, 2006 || Mount Lemmon || Mount Lemmon Survey || K-2 || align=right | 1.9 km || 
|-id=736 bgcolor=#E9E9E9
| 204736 ||  || — || April 25, 2006 || Kitt Peak || Spacewatch || — || align=right | 3.4 km || 
|-id=737 bgcolor=#fefefe
| 204737 ||  || — || April 25, 2006 || Kitt Peak || Spacewatch || — || align=right | 1.1 km || 
|-id=738 bgcolor=#fefefe
| 204738 ||  || — || April 26, 2006 || Kitt Peak || Spacewatch || — || align=right | 1.3 km || 
|-id=739 bgcolor=#d6d6d6
| 204739 ||  || — || April 26, 2006 || Kitt Peak || Spacewatch || — || align=right | 5.3 km || 
|-id=740 bgcolor=#fefefe
| 204740 ||  || — || April 29, 2006 || Siding Spring || SSS || — || align=right | 1.7 km || 
|-id=741 bgcolor=#fefefe
| 204741 ||  || — || April 30, 2006 || Catalina || CSS || — || align=right | 1.3 km || 
|-id=742 bgcolor=#fefefe
| 204742 ||  || — || April 30, 2006 || Kitt Peak || Spacewatch || — || align=right | 1.3 km || 
|-id=743 bgcolor=#d6d6d6
| 204743 ||  || — || April 30, 2006 || Kitt Peak || Spacewatch || — || align=right | 5.0 km || 
|-id=744 bgcolor=#E9E9E9
| 204744 ||  || — || April 30, 2006 || Kitt Peak || Spacewatch || — || align=right | 2.7 km || 
|-id=745 bgcolor=#fefefe
| 204745 ||  || — || April 26, 2006 || Kitt Peak || Spacewatch || NYS || align=right data-sort-value="0.96" | 960 m || 
|-id=746 bgcolor=#E9E9E9
| 204746 ||  || — || April 20, 2006 || Kitt Peak || Spacewatch || HEN || align=right | 1.5 km || 
|-id=747 bgcolor=#E9E9E9
| 204747 ||  || — || May 1, 2006 || Socorro || LINEAR || — || align=right | 3.7 km || 
|-id=748 bgcolor=#E9E9E9
| 204748 ||  || — || May 2, 2006 || Mount Lemmon || Mount Lemmon Survey || — || align=right | 1.2 km || 
|-id=749 bgcolor=#E9E9E9
| 204749 ||  || — || May 4, 2006 || Mount Lemmon || Mount Lemmon Survey || AGN || align=right | 1.9 km || 
|-id=750 bgcolor=#E9E9E9
| 204750 ||  || — || May 4, 2006 || Siding Spring || SSS || MAR || align=right | 1.7 km || 
|-id=751 bgcolor=#E9E9E9
| 204751 ||  || — || May 2, 2006 || Mount Lemmon || Mount Lemmon Survey || WIT || align=right | 1.6 km || 
|-id=752 bgcolor=#E9E9E9
| 204752 ||  || — || May 2, 2006 || Kitt Peak || Spacewatch || — || align=right | 2.8 km || 
|-id=753 bgcolor=#E9E9E9
| 204753 ||  || — || May 4, 2006 || Mount Lemmon || Mount Lemmon Survey || — || align=right | 1.4 km || 
|-id=754 bgcolor=#d6d6d6
| 204754 ||  || — || May 3, 2006 || Kitt Peak || Spacewatch || THM || align=right | 5.5 km || 
|-id=755 bgcolor=#d6d6d6
| 204755 ||  || — || May 4, 2006 || Kitt Peak || Spacewatch || CHA || align=right | 2.2 km || 
|-id=756 bgcolor=#E9E9E9
| 204756 ||  || — || May 4, 2006 || Kitt Peak || Spacewatch || HEN || align=right | 1.2 km || 
|-id=757 bgcolor=#E9E9E9
| 204757 ||  || — || May 5, 2006 || Kitt Peak || Spacewatch || NEM || align=right | 2.6 km || 
|-id=758 bgcolor=#E9E9E9
| 204758 ||  || — || May 6, 2006 || Mount Lemmon || Mount Lemmon Survey || HOF || align=right | 5.6 km || 
|-id=759 bgcolor=#fefefe
| 204759 ||  || — || May 7, 2006 || Mount Lemmon || Mount Lemmon Survey || NYS || align=right data-sort-value="0.79" | 790 m || 
|-id=760 bgcolor=#d6d6d6
| 204760 ||  || — || May 2, 2006 || Mount Lemmon || Mount Lemmon Survey || — || align=right | 3.5 km || 
|-id=761 bgcolor=#fefefe
| 204761 ||  || — || May 7, 2006 || Kitt Peak || Spacewatch || FLO || align=right data-sort-value="0.85" | 850 m || 
|-id=762 bgcolor=#E9E9E9
| 204762 ||  || — || May 7, 2006 || Mount Lemmon || Mount Lemmon Survey || — || align=right | 1.3 km || 
|-id=763 bgcolor=#E9E9E9
| 204763 ||  || — || May 7, 2006 || Catalina || CSS || — || align=right | 3.2 km || 
|-id=764 bgcolor=#fefefe
| 204764 ||  || — || May 1, 2006 || Kitt Peak || M. W. Buie || — || align=right data-sort-value="0.83" | 830 m || 
|-id=765 bgcolor=#E9E9E9
| 204765 || 2006 KH || — || May 16, 2006 || Palomar || NEAT || — || align=right | 2.5 km || 
|-id=766 bgcolor=#fefefe
| 204766 ||  || — || May 19, 2006 || Mount Lemmon || Mount Lemmon Survey || — || align=right data-sort-value="0.96" | 960 m || 
|-id=767 bgcolor=#E9E9E9
| 204767 ||  || — || May 19, 2006 || Anderson Mesa || LONEOS || — || align=right | 3.0 km || 
|-id=768 bgcolor=#fefefe
| 204768 ||  || — || May 19, 2006 || Mount Lemmon || Mount Lemmon Survey || — || align=right | 1.0 km || 
|-id=769 bgcolor=#d6d6d6
| 204769 ||  || — || May 19, 2006 || Mount Lemmon || Mount Lemmon Survey || — || align=right | 4.4 km || 
|-id=770 bgcolor=#d6d6d6
| 204770 ||  || — || May 19, 2006 || Catalina || CSS || HYG || align=right | 4.6 km || 
|-id=771 bgcolor=#fefefe
| 204771 ||  || — || May 18, 2006 || Siding Spring || SSS || KLI || align=right | 1.6 km || 
|-id=772 bgcolor=#E9E9E9
| 204772 ||  || — || May 20, 2006 || Kitt Peak || Spacewatch || — || align=right | 1.8 km || 
|-id=773 bgcolor=#E9E9E9
| 204773 ||  || — || May 16, 2006 || Siding Spring || SSS || — || align=right | 2.8 km || 
|-id=774 bgcolor=#d6d6d6
| 204774 ||  || — || May 18, 2006 || Siding Spring || SSS || — || align=right | 6.9 km || 
|-id=775 bgcolor=#E9E9E9
| 204775 ||  || — || May 19, 2006 || Mount Lemmon || Mount Lemmon Survey || — || align=right | 2.8 km || 
|-id=776 bgcolor=#E9E9E9
| 204776 ||  || — || May 20, 2006 || Kitt Peak || Spacewatch || — || align=right | 2.7 km || 
|-id=777 bgcolor=#E9E9E9
| 204777 ||  || — || May 20, 2006 || Siding Spring || SSS || — || align=right | 2.4 km || 
|-id=778 bgcolor=#E9E9E9
| 204778 ||  || — || May 21, 2006 || Mount Lemmon || Mount Lemmon Survey || — || align=right | 2.0 km || 
|-id=779 bgcolor=#fefefe
| 204779 ||  || — || May 21, 2006 || Mount Lemmon || Mount Lemmon Survey || V || align=right | 1.2 km || 
|-id=780 bgcolor=#E9E9E9
| 204780 ||  || — || May 21, 2006 || Kitt Peak || Spacewatch || EUN || align=right | 1.7 km || 
|-id=781 bgcolor=#E9E9E9
| 204781 ||  || — || May 23, 2006 || Mount Lemmon || Mount Lemmon Survey || RAF || align=right | 2.0 km || 
|-id=782 bgcolor=#d6d6d6
| 204782 ||  || — || May 24, 2006 || Palomar || NEAT || — || align=right | 3.9 km || 
|-id=783 bgcolor=#E9E9E9
| 204783 ||  || — || May 21, 2006 || Mount Lemmon || Mount Lemmon Survey || — || align=right | 3.7 km || 
|-id=784 bgcolor=#d6d6d6
| 204784 ||  || — || May 25, 2006 || Kitt Peak || Spacewatch || — || align=right | 3.4 km || 
|-id=785 bgcolor=#E9E9E9
| 204785 ||  || — || May 28, 2006 || Catalina || CSS || EUN || align=right | 2.1 km || 
|-id=786 bgcolor=#E9E9E9
| 204786 Wehlau ||  ||  || May 25, 2006 || Mauna Kea || P. A. Wiegert || — || align=right | 1.1 km || 
|-id=787 bgcolor=#d6d6d6
| 204787 ||  || — || July 6, 2006 || Siding Spring || SSS || THB || align=right | 6.7 km || 
|-id=788 bgcolor=#d6d6d6
| 204788 ||  || — || August 13, 2006 || Palomar || NEAT || — || align=right | 4.1 km || 
|-id=789 bgcolor=#d6d6d6
| 204789 ||  || — || August 12, 2006 || Palomar || NEAT || — || align=right | 5.5 km || 
|-id=790 bgcolor=#d6d6d6
| 204790 ||  || — || August 21, 2006 || Hibiscus || S. F. Hönig || — || align=right | 4.7 km || 
|-id=791 bgcolor=#d6d6d6
| 204791 ||  || — || August 27, 2006 || Goodricke-Pigott || R. A. Tucker || — || align=right | 4.5 km || 
|-id=792 bgcolor=#d6d6d6
| 204792 ||  || — || August 19, 2006 || Palomar || NEAT || — || align=right | 4.4 km || 
|-id=793 bgcolor=#d6d6d6
| 204793 ||  || — || August 23, 2006 || Palomar || NEAT || — || align=right | 4.7 km || 
|-id=794 bgcolor=#E9E9E9
| 204794 ||  || — || August 24, 2006 || Palomar || NEAT || KON || align=right | 3.5 km || 
|-id=795 bgcolor=#d6d6d6
| 204795 ||  || — || August 27, 2006 || Kitt Peak || Spacewatch || — || align=right | 3.8 km || 
|-id=796 bgcolor=#E9E9E9
| 204796 ||  || — || August 27, 2006 || Kitt Peak || Spacewatch || — || align=right | 3.2 km || 
|-id=797 bgcolor=#d6d6d6
| 204797 ||  || — || August 27, 2006 || Anderson Mesa || LONEOS || — || align=right | 5.6 km || 
|-id=798 bgcolor=#E9E9E9
| 204798 ||  || — || August 19, 2006 || Anderson Mesa || LONEOS || — || align=right | 1.5 km || 
|-id=799 bgcolor=#d6d6d6
| 204799 ||  || — || September 14, 2006 || Kitt Peak || Spacewatch || — || align=right | 3.5 km || 
|-id=800 bgcolor=#E9E9E9
| 204800 ||  || — || September 14, 2006 || Catalina || CSS || — || align=right | 2.9 km || 
|}

204801–204900 

|-bgcolor=#E9E9E9
| 204801 ||  || — || September 15, 2006 || Kitt Peak || Spacewatch || — || align=right | 1.9 km || 
|-id=802 bgcolor=#d6d6d6
| 204802 ||  || — || September 17, 2006 || Anderson Mesa || LONEOS || EOS || align=right | 3.0 km || 
|-id=803 bgcolor=#d6d6d6
| 204803 ||  || — || September 18, 2006 || Kitt Peak || Spacewatch || 3:2 || align=right | 5.9 km || 
|-id=804 bgcolor=#d6d6d6
| 204804 ||  || — || September 16, 2006 || Apache Point || A. C. Becker || — || align=right | 5.2 km || 
|-id=805 bgcolor=#d6d6d6
| 204805 Šipöcz ||  ||  || October 11, 2006 || Modra || Modra Obs. || — || align=right | 4.2 km || 
|-id=806 bgcolor=#fefefe
| 204806 ||  || — || April 11, 2007 || Kitt Peak || Spacewatch || — || align=right data-sort-value="0.94" | 940 m || 
|-id=807 bgcolor=#E9E9E9
| 204807 ||  || — || April 11, 2007 || Kitt Peak || Spacewatch || — || align=right | 2.5 km || 
|-id=808 bgcolor=#E9E9E9
| 204808 ||  || — || April 14, 2007 || Kitt Peak || Spacewatch || — || align=right | 1.2 km || 
|-id=809 bgcolor=#E9E9E9
| 204809 ||  || — || April 18, 2007 || Mount Lemmon || Mount Lemmon Survey || MIS || align=right | 3.4 km || 
|-id=810 bgcolor=#E9E9E9
| 204810 ||  || — || May 11, 2007 || Mount Lemmon || Mount Lemmon Survey || — || align=right | 1.3 km || 
|-id=811 bgcolor=#E9E9E9
| 204811 ||  || — || June 11, 2007 || Siding Spring || SSS || — || align=right | 2.8 km || 
|-id=812 bgcolor=#fefefe
| 204812 ||  || — || June 16, 2007 || Kitt Peak || Spacewatch || — || align=right | 1.8 km || 
|-id=813 bgcolor=#E9E9E9
| 204813 ||  || — || June 21, 2007 || Tiki || S. F. Hönig, N. Teamo || — || align=right | 2.3 km || 
|-id=814 bgcolor=#E9E9E9
| 204814 ||  || — || June 21, 2007 || Anderson Mesa || LONEOS || MAR || align=right | 1.8 km || 
|-id=815 bgcolor=#E9E9E9
| 204815 ||  || — || July 10, 2007 || Siding Spring || SSS || BRU || align=right | 4.3 km || 
|-id=816 bgcolor=#E9E9E9
| 204816 Andreacamilleri || 2007 OZ ||  || July 16, 2007 || Vallemare di Borbona || V. S. Casulli || GEF || align=right | 1.4 km || 
|-id=817 bgcolor=#fefefe
| 204817 ||  || — || July 18, 2007 || Mount Lemmon || Mount Lemmon Survey || MAS || align=right | 1.1 km || 
|-id=818 bgcolor=#fefefe
| 204818 ||  || — || July 22, 2007 || Tiki || S. F. Hönig, N. Teamo || MAS || align=right | 1.2 km || 
|-id=819 bgcolor=#fefefe
| 204819 ||  || — || August 6, 2007 || Reedy Creek || J. Broughton || MAS || align=right | 1.2 km || 
|-id=820 bgcolor=#fefefe
| 204820 ||  || — || August 7, 2007 || Reedy Creek || J. Broughton || ERI || align=right | 2.2 km || 
|-id=821 bgcolor=#fefefe
| 204821 ||  || — || August 9, 2007 || Socorro || LINEAR || — || align=right data-sort-value="0.99" | 990 m || 
|-id=822 bgcolor=#fefefe
| 204822 ||  || — || August 11, 2007 || OAM || OAM Obs. || NYS || align=right | 3.6 km || 
|-id=823 bgcolor=#fefefe
| 204823 ||  || — || August 8, 2007 || Socorro || LINEAR || — || align=right | 1.1 km || 
|-id=824 bgcolor=#E9E9E9
| 204824 ||  || — || August 9, 2007 || Socorro || LINEAR || — || align=right | 1.4 km || 
|-id=825 bgcolor=#E9E9E9
| 204825 ||  || — || August 9, 2007 || Socorro || LINEAR || — || align=right | 1.3 km || 
|-id=826 bgcolor=#E9E9E9
| 204826 ||  || — || August 9, 2007 || Socorro || LINEAR || — || align=right | 2.9 km || 
|-id=827 bgcolor=#E9E9E9
| 204827 ||  || — || August 9, 2007 || Socorro || LINEAR || DOR || align=right | 4.5 km || 
|-id=828 bgcolor=#fefefe
| 204828 ||  || — || August 10, 2007 || Kitt Peak || Spacewatch || — || align=right | 1.9 km || 
|-id=829 bgcolor=#fefefe
| 204829 ||  || — || August 12, 2007 || Socorro || LINEAR || FLO || align=right | 1.1 km || 
|-id=830 bgcolor=#E9E9E9
| 204830 ||  || — || August 13, 2007 || Bisei SG Center || BATTeRS || — || align=right | 1.7 km || 
|-id=831 bgcolor=#E9E9E9
| 204831 Levski ||  ||  || August 14, 2007 || Zvezdno Obshtestvo || Zvezdno Obshtestvo Obs. || — || align=right | 3.3 km || 
|-id=832 bgcolor=#fefefe
| 204832 ||  || — || August 5, 2007 || Socorro || LINEAR || CHL || align=right | 3.4 km || 
|-id=833 bgcolor=#fefefe
| 204833 ||  || — || August 9, 2007 || Kitt Peak || Spacewatch || — || align=right | 1.1 km || 
|-id=834 bgcolor=#d6d6d6
| 204834 ||  || — || August 10, 2007 || Kitt Peak || Spacewatch || — || align=right | 3.9 km || 
|-id=835 bgcolor=#d6d6d6
| 204835 ||  || — || August 10, 2007 || Kitt Peak || Spacewatch || — || align=right | 3.9 km || 
|-id=836 bgcolor=#d6d6d6
| 204836 Xiexiaosi ||  ||  || August 16, 2007 || XuYi || PMO NEO || URS || align=right | 8.0 km || 
|-id=837 bgcolor=#d6d6d6
| 204837 ||  || — || August 21, 2007 || Hibiscus || S. F. Hönig, N. Teamo || EOS || align=right | 2.8 km || 
|-id=838 bgcolor=#d6d6d6
| 204838 ||  || — || August 21, 2007 || Anderson Mesa || LONEOS || — || align=right | 3.4 km || 
|-id=839 bgcolor=#fefefe
| 204839 Suzhouyuanlin ||  ||  || August 16, 2007 || XuYi || PMO NEO || — || align=right | 1.3 km || 
|-id=840 bgcolor=#fefefe
| 204840 ||  || — || September 3, 2007 || Catalina || CSS || — || align=right | 2.2 km || 
|-id=841 bgcolor=#fefefe
| 204841 ||  || — || September 3, 2007 || Catalina || CSS || NYS || align=right data-sort-value="0.99" | 990 m || 
|-id=842 bgcolor=#d6d6d6
| 204842 Fengchia ||  ||  || September 5, 2007 || Lulin Observatory || C.-S. Lin, Q.-z. Ye || THM || align=right | 3.6 km || 
|-id=843 bgcolor=#d6d6d6
| 204843 ||  || — || September 3, 2007 || Catalina || CSS || THM || align=right | 3.0 km || 
|-id=844 bgcolor=#E9E9E9
| 204844 ||  || — || September 3, 2007 || Catalina || CSS || — || align=right | 3.1 km || 
|-id=845 bgcolor=#E9E9E9
| 204845 ||  || — || September 8, 2007 || Anderson Mesa || LONEOS || — || align=right | 2.4 km || 
|-id=846 bgcolor=#d6d6d6
| 204846 ||  || — || September 9, 2007 || Mount Lemmon || Mount Lemmon Survey || KAR || align=right | 1.6 km || 
|-id=847 bgcolor=#C2FFFF
| 204847 ||  || — || September 10, 2007 || Mount Lemmon || Mount Lemmon Survey || L4 || align=right | 10 km || 
|-id=848 bgcolor=#E9E9E9
| 204848 ||  || — || September 10, 2007 || Kitt Peak || Spacewatch || HEN || align=right | 1.3 km || 
|-id=849 bgcolor=#d6d6d6
| 204849 ||  || — || September 11, 2007 || Catalina || CSS || KOR || align=right | 2.0 km || 
|-id=850 bgcolor=#d6d6d6
| 204850 ||  || — || September 12, 2007 || Mount Lemmon || Mount Lemmon Survey || — || align=right | 5.0 km || 
|-id=851 bgcolor=#d6d6d6
| 204851 ||  || — || September 12, 2007 || Mount Lemmon || Mount Lemmon Survey || SHU3:2 || align=right | 7.3 km || 
|-id=852 bgcolor=#E9E9E9
| 204852 Frankfurt ||  ||  || September 15, 2007 || Taunus || E. Schwab, R. Kling || — || align=right | 3.6 km || 
|-id=853 bgcolor=#E9E9E9
| 204853 ||  || — || September 14, 2007 || Mount Lemmon || Mount Lemmon Survey || AST || align=right | 3.4 km || 
|-id=854 bgcolor=#E9E9E9
| 204854 ||  || — || September 13, 2007 || Socorro || LINEAR || — || align=right | 2.9 km || 
|-id=855 bgcolor=#fefefe
| 204855 ||  || — || September 13, 2007 || Socorro || LINEAR || MAS || align=right | 1.3 km || 
|-id=856 bgcolor=#d6d6d6
| 204856 ||  || — || September 10, 2007 || Mount Lemmon || Mount Lemmon Survey || SHU3:2 || align=right | 6.5 km || 
|-id=857 bgcolor=#fefefe
| 204857 ||  || — || September 10, 2007 || Mount Lemmon || Mount Lemmon Survey || — || align=right | 1.7 km || 
|-id=858 bgcolor=#E9E9E9
| 204858 ||  || — || September 10, 2007 || Catalina || CSS || — || align=right | 2.6 km || 
|-id=859 bgcolor=#E9E9E9
| 204859 ||  || — || September 11, 2007 || Catalina || CSS || HEN || align=right | 1.7 km || 
|-id=860 bgcolor=#d6d6d6
| 204860 ||  || — || September 12, 2007 || Kitt Peak || Spacewatch || — || align=right | 3.0 km || 
|-id=861 bgcolor=#fefefe
| 204861 ||  || — || September 9, 2007 || Kitt Peak || Spacewatch || — || align=right | 1.4 km || 
|-id=862 bgcolor=#E9E9E9
| 204862 ||  || — || September 10, 2007 || Mount Lemmon || Mount Lemmon Survey || — || align=right | 1.5 km || 
|-id=863 bgcolor=#E9E9E9
| 204863 ||  || — || September 11, 2007 || Kitt Peak || Spacewatch || — || align=right | 1.2 km || 
|-id=864 bgcolor=#d6d6d6
| 204864 ||  || — || September 11, 2007 || Mount Lemmon || Mount Lemmon Survey || — || align=right | 4.9 km || 
|-id=865 bgcolor=#d6d6d6
| 204865 ||  || — || September 12, 2007 || Mount Lemmon || Mount Lemmon Survey || THM || align=right | 3.6 km || 
|-id=866 bgcolor=#d6d6d6
| 204866 ||  || — || September 12, 2007 || Mount Lemmon || Mount Lemmon Survey || KAR || align=right | 1.8 km || 
|-id=867 bgcolor=#d6d6d6
| 204867 ||  || — || September 15, 2007 || Socorro || LINEAR || THM || align=right | 3.5 km || 
|-id=868 bgcolor=#E9E9E9
| 204868 ||  || — || September 15, 2007 || Kitt Peak || Spacewatch || — || align=right | 2.6 km || 
|-id=869 bgcolor=#E9E9E9
| 204869 ||  || — || September 6, 2007 || Siding Spring || SSS || GER || align=right | 2.3 km || 
|-id=870 bgcolor=#d6d6d6
| 204870 ||  || — || September 5, 2007 || Catalina || CSS || — || align=right | 4.4 km || 
|-id=871 bgcolor=#d6d6d6
| 204871 ||  || — || September 12, 2007 || Mount Lemmon || Mount Lemmon Survey || — || align=right | 3.1 km || 
|-id=872 bgcolor=#E9E9E9
| 204872 ||  || — || September 14, 2007 || Mount Lemmon || Mount Lemmon Survey || — || align=right | 1.3 km || 
|-id=873 bgcolor=#E9E9E9
| 204873 FAIR ||  ||  || September 17, 2007 || Taunus || E. Schwab, R. Kling || — || align=right | 1.2 km || 
|-id=874 bgcolor=#E9E9E9
| 204874 ||  || — || September 20, 2007 || Altschwendt || W. Ries || — || align=right | 2.9 km || 
|-id=875 bgcolor=#d6d6d6
| 204875 ||  || — || September 18, 2007 || Kitt Peak || Spacewatch || — || align=right | 3.5 km || 
|-id=876 bgcolor=#d6d6d6
| 204876 ||  || — || October 4, 2007 || Mount Lemmon || Mount Lemmon Survey || THM || align=right | 3.3 km || 
|-id=877 bgcolor=#E9E9E9
| 204877 ||  || — || October 4, 2007 || Kitt Peak || Spacewatch || — || align=right | 2.9 km || 
|-id=878 bgcolor=#d6d6d6
| 204878 ||  || — || October 3, 2007 || Hibiscus || Hibiscus Obs. || — || align=right | 4.3 km || 
|-id=879 bgcolor=#fefefe
| 204879 ||  || — || October 6, 2007 || Kitt Peak || Spacewatch || — || align=right data-sort-value="0.98" | 980 m || 
|-id=880 bgcolor=#d6d6d6
| 204880 ||  || — || October 10, 2007 || Dauban || Chante-Perdrix Obs. || KOR || align=right | 1.8 km || 
|-id=881 bgcolor=#E9E9E9
| 204881 ||  || — || October 7, 2007 || Catalina || CSS || NEM || align=right | 3.2 km || 
|-id=882 bgcolor=#d6d6d6
| 204882 ||  || — || October 6, 2007 || Kitt Peak || Spacewatch || THM || align=right | 3.7 km || 
|-id=883 bgcolor=#d6d6d6
| 204883 ||  || — || October 6, 2007 || Kitt Peak || Spacewatch || THM || align=right | 3.2 km || 
|-id=884 bgcolor=#d6d6d6
| 204884 ||  || — || October 8, 2007 || Catalina || CSS || — || align=right | 5.4 km || 
|-id=885 bgcolor=#d6d6d6
| 204885 ||  || — || October 6, 2007 || Socorro || LINEAR || KOR || align=right | 2.1 km || 
|-id=886 bgcolor=#E9E9E9
| 204886 ||  || — || October 6, 2007 || Socorro || LINEAR || — || align=right | 1.3 km || 
|-id=887 bgcolor=#d6d6d6
| 204887 ||  || — || October 8, 2007 || Socorro || LINEAR || — || align=right | 3.4 km || 
|-id=888 bgcolor=#d6d6d6
| 204888 ||  || — || October 13, 2007 || Socorro || LINEAR || — || align=right | 4.8 km || 
|-id=889 bgcolor=#d6d6d6
| 204889 ||  || — || October 9, 2007 || Kitt Peak || Spacewatch || — || align=right | 3.1 km || 
|-id=890 bgcolor=#fefefe
| 204890 ||  || — || October 14, 2007 || Mount Lemmon || Mount Lemmon Survey || NYS || align=right | 2.8 km || 
|-id=891 bgcolor=#d6d6d6
| 204891 ||  || — || October 11, 2007 || Kitt Peak || Spacewatch || VER || align=right | 4.5 km || 
|-id=892 bgcolor=#d6d6d6
| 204892 ||  || — || October 11, 2007 || Kitt Peak || Spacewatch || 3:2 || align=right | 5.4 km || 
|-id=893 bgcolor=#d6d6d6
| 204893 ||  || — || October 11, 2007 || Catalina || CSS || — || align=right | 6.0 km || 
|-id=894 bgcolor=#d6d6d6
| 204894 ||  || — || October 13, 2007 || Mount Lemmon || Mount Lemmon Survey || — || align=right | 3.1 km || 
|-id=895 bgcolor=#d6d6d6
| 204895 ||  || — || October 15, 2007 || Mount Lemmon || Mount Lemmon Survey || — || align=right | 5.5 km || 
|-id=896 bgcolor=#d6d6d6
| 204896 Giorgiobocca ||  ||  || October 16, 2007 || Vallemare di Borbona || V. S. Casulli || — || align=right | 5.6 km || 
|-id=897 bgcolor=#d6d6d6
| 204897 ||  || — || October 18, 2007 || Mount Lemmon || Mount Lemmon Survey || KAR || align=right | 1.4 km || 
|-id=898 bgcolor=#E9E9E9
| 204898 ||  || — || October 19, 2007 || Anderson Mesa || LONEOS || — || align=right | 3.5 km || 
|-id=899 bgcolor=#d6d6d6
| 204899 ||  || — || October 30, 2007 || Mount Lemmon || Mount Lemmon Survey || — || align=right | 3.4 km || 
|-id=900 bgcolor=#d6d6d6
| 204900 ||  || — || October 30, 2007 || Mount Lemmon || Mount Lemmon Survey || KOR || align=right | 1.9 km || 
|}

204901–205000 

|-bgcolor=#d6d6d6
| 204901 ||  || — || October 31, 2007 || Mount Lemmon || Mount Lemmon Survey || KOR || align=right | 2.3 km || 
|-id=902 bgcolor=#d6d6d6
| 204902 ||  || — || October 17, 2007 || Catalina || CSS || — || align=right | 4.4 km || 
|-id=903 bgcolor=#d6d6d6
| 204903 ||  || — || October 30, 2007 || Catalina || CSS || — || align=right | 4.3 km || 
|-id=904 bgcolor=#d6d6d6
| 204904 ||  || — || November 4, 2007 || Kitt Peak || Spacewatch || KOR || align=right | 1.8 km || 
|-id=905 bgcolor=#d6d6d6
| 204905 ||  || — || November 7, 2007 || OAM || OAM Obs. || ALA || align=right | 5.4 km || 
|-id=906 bgcolor=#d6d6d6
| 204906 ||  || — || November 3, 2007 || Kitt Peak || Spacewatch || — || align=right | 4.4 km || 
|-id=907 bgcolor=#d6d6d6
| 204907 ||  || — || November 14, 2007 || Kitt Peak || Spacewatch || — || align=right | 3.7 km || 
|-id=908 bgcolor=#d6d6d6
| 204908 ||  || — || November 17, 2007 || Catalina || CSS || EOS || align=right | 3.0 km || 
|-id=909 bgcolor=#fefefe
| 204909 ||  || — || February 28, 2008 || Mount Lemmon || Mount Lemmon Survey || V || align=right | 1.1 km || 
|-id=910 bgcolor=#d6d6d6
| 204910 ||  || — || April 24, 2008 || Kitt Peak || Spacewatch || — || align=right | 3.4 km || 
|-id=911 bgcolor=#C2FFFF
| 204911 ||  || — || August 22, 2008 || Kitt Peak || Spacewatch || L4 || align=right | 14 km || 
|-id=912 bgcolor=#fefefe
| 204912 ||  || — || September 6, 2008 || Kitt Peak || Spacewatch || — || align=right data-sort-value="0.95" | 950 m || 
|-id=913 bgcolor=#E9E9E9
| 204913 ||  || — || September 9, 2008 || Mount Lemmon || Mount Lemmon Survey || HEN || align=right | 1.4 km || 
|-id=914 bgcolor=#FA8072
| 204914 ||  || — || September 20, 2008 || Kitt Peak || Spacewatch || — || align=right | 1.8 km || 
|-id=915 bgcolor=#d6d6d6
| 204915 ||  || — || September 20, 2008 || Mount Lemmon || Mount Lemmon Survey || — || align=right | 3.1 km || 
|-id=916 bgcolor=#E9E9E9
| 204916 ||  || — || September 20, 2008 || Mount Lemmon || Mount Lemmon Survey || MRX || align=right | 1.5 km || 
|-id=917 bgcolor=#d6d6d6
| 204917 ||  || — || September 26, 2008 || Bisei SG Center || BATTeRS || — || align=right | 4.4 km || 
|-id=918 bgcolor=#d6d6d6
| 204918 ||  || — || September 24, 2008 || Mount Lemmon || Mount Lemmon Survey || KOR || align=right | 1.8 km || 
|-id=919 bgcolor=#d6d6d6
| 204919 ||  || — || September 24, 2008 || Kitt Peak || Spacewatch || — || align=right | 4.3 km || 
|-id=920 bgcolor=#E9E9E9
| 204920 ||  || — || September 28, 2008 || Socorro || LINEAR || — || align=right | 2.1 km || 
|-id=921 bgcolor=#E9E9E9
| 204921 ||  || — || September 22, 2008 || Mount Lemmon || Mount Lemmon Survey || — || align=right | 1.8 km || 
|-id=922 bgcolor=#E9E9E9
| 204922 ||  || — || September 26, 2008 || Kitt Peak || Spacewatch || — || align=right | 3.5 km || 
|-id=923 bgcolor=#d6d6d6
| 204923 ||  || — || September 23, 2008 || Kitt Peak || Spacewatch || — || align=right | 3.4 km || 
|-id=924 bgcolor=#fefefe
| 204924 ||  || — || September 24, 2008 || Catalina || CSS || PHO || align=right | 1.7 km || 
|-id=925 bgcolor=#E9E9E9
| 204925 ||  || — || October 1, 2008 || OAM || OAM Obs. || — || align=right data-sort-value="0.93" | 930 m || 
|-id=926 bgcolor=#E9E9E9
| 204926 ||  || — || October 6, 2008 || Goodricke-Pigott || R. A. Tucker || — || align=right | 4.5 km || 
|-id=927 bgcolor=#C2FFFF
| 204927 ||  || — || October 2, 2008 || Kitt Peak || Spacewatch || L4 || align=right | 11 km || 
|-id=928 bgcolor=#d6d6d6
| 204928 ||  || — || October 2, 2008 || Kitt Peak || Spacewatch || — || align=right | 2.7 km || 
|-id=929 bgcolor=#fefefe
| 204929 ||  || — || October 3, 2008 || Kitt Peak || Spacewatch || V || align=right data-sort-value="0.94" | 940 m || 
|-id=930 bgcolor=#E9E9E9
| 204930 ||  || — || October 6, 2008 || Kitt Peak || Spacewatch || — || align=right | 2.0 km || 
|-id=931 bgcolor=#E9E9E9
| 204931 ||  || — || October 20, 2008 || Kitt Peak || Spacewatch || — || align=right | 1.8 km || 
|-id=932 bgcolor=#E9E9E9
| 204932 ||  || — || October 20, 2008 || Mount Lemmon || Mount Lemmon Survey || — || align=right | 1.2 km || 
|-id=933 bgcolor=#d6d6d6
| 204933 ||  || — || October 20, 2008 || Kitt Peak || Spacewatch || — || align=right | 3.2 km || 
|-id=934 bgcolor=#E9E9E9
| 204934 ||  || — || October 29, 2008 || Goodricke-Pigott || R. A. Tucker || JUN || align=right | 1.5 km || 
|-id=935 bgcolor=#E9E9E9
| 204935 ||  || — || October 21, 2008 || Mount Lemmon || Mount Lemmon Survey || INO || align=right | 1.4 km || 
|-id=936 bgcolor=#fefefe
| 204936 ||  || — || October 23, 2008 || Kitt Peak || Spacewatch || NYS || align=right data-sort-value="0.81" | 810 m || 
|-id=937 bgcolor=#E9E9E9
| 204937 ||  || — || October 23, 2008 || Kitt Peak || Spacewatch || PAD || align=right | 2.6 km || 
|-id=938 bgcolor=#E9E9E9
| 204938 ||  || — || October 23, 2008 || Kitt Peak || Spacewatch || — || align=right | 3.3 km || 
|-id=939 bgcolor=#E9E9E9
| 204939 ||  || — || October 24, 2008 || Kitt Peak || Spacewatch || AGN || align=right | 1.9 km || 
|-id=940 bgcolor=#d6d6d6
| 204940 ||  || — || October 25, 2008 || Mount Lemmon || Mount Lemmon Survey || — || align=right | 6.3 km || 
|-id=941 bgcolor=#fefefe
| 204941 ||  || — || October 24, 2008 || Socorro || LINEAR || V || align=right data-sort-value="0.79" | 790 m || 
|-id=942 bgcolor=#fefefe
| 204942 ||  || — || October 27, 2008 || Kitt Peak || Spacewatch || NYS || align=right data-sort-value="0.66" | 660 m || 
|-id=943 bgcolor=#E9E9E9
| 204943 ||  || — || October 27, 2008 || Kitt Peak || Spacewatch || — || align=right | 2.2 km || 
|-id=944 bgcolor=#d6d6d6
| 204944 ||  || — || October 28, 2008 || Mount Lemmon || Mount Lemmon Survey || KAR || align=right | 1.5 km || 
|-id=945 bgcolor=#E9E9E9
| 204945 ||  || — || October 28, 2008 || Mount Lemmon || Mount Lemmon Survey || WIT || align=right | 1.4 km || 
|-id=946 bgcolor=#E9E9E9
| 204946 ||  || — || October 29, 2008 || Kitt Peak || Spacewatch || — || align=right | 1.8 km || 
|-id=947 bgcolor=#fefefe
| 204947 ||  || — || October 30, 2008 || Kitt Peak || Spacewatch || — || align=right data-sort-value="0.98" | 980 m || 
|-id=948 bgcolor=#fefefe
| 204948 ||  || — || October 31, 2008 || Kitt Peak || Spacewatch || — || align=right | 1.4 km || 
|-id=949 bgcolor=#d6d6d6
| 204949 || 2008 VT || — || November 2, 2008 || RAS || A. Lowe || TIR || align=right | 5.0 km || 
|-id=950 bgcolor=#d6d6d6
| 204950 ||  || — || November 3, 2008 || Kitt Peak || Spacewatch || — || align=right | 3.8 km || 
|-id=951 bgcolor=#fefefe
| 204951 ||  || — || November 6, 2008 || Catalina || CSS || — || align=right | 1.1 km || 
|-id=952 bgcolor=#d6d6d6
| 204952 ||  || — || November 6, 2008 || Mount Lemmon || Mount Lemmon Survey || — || align=right | 4.4 km || 
|-id=953 bgcolor=#E9E9E9
| 204953 ||  || — || November 17, 2008 || Kitt Peak || Spacewatch || — || align=right | 2.0 km || 
|-id=954 bgcolor=#d6d6d6
| 204954 ||  || — || November 18, 2008 || Catalina || CSS || TIR || align=right | 5.0 km || 
|-id=955 bgcolor=#fefefe
| 204955 ||  || — || November 19, 2008 || Socorro || LINEAR || — || align=right | 2.1 km || 
|-id=956 bgcolor=#E9E9E9
| 204956 ||  || — || November 22, 2008 || OAM || OAM Obs. || — || align=right | 1.7 km || 
|-id=957 bgcolor=#E9E9E9
| 204957 ||  || — || November 18, 2008 || Kitt Peak || Spacewatch || — || align=right | 1.5 km || 
|-id=958 bgcolor=#E9E9E9
| 204958 ||  || — || November 21, 2008 || Kitt Peak || Spacewatch || — || align=right | 3.4 km || 
|-id=959 bgcolor=#E9E9E9
| 204959 ||  || — || November 23, 2008 || OAM || OAM Obs. || MAR || align=right | 2.4 km || 
|-id=960 bgcolor=#d6d6d6
| 204960 || 4713 P-L || — || September 24, 1960 || Palomar || PLS || — || align=right | 3.2 km || 
|-id=961 bgcolor=#fefefe
| 204961 || 6377 P-L || — || September 24, 1960 || Palomar || PLS || — || align=right | 1.0 km || 
|-id=962 bgcolor=#fefefe
| 204962 || 5057 T-2 || — || September 25, 1973 || Palomar || PLS || V || align=right data-sort-value="0.74" | 740 m || 
|-id=963 bgcolor=#d6d6d6
| 204963 ||  || — || March 2, 1981 || Siding Spring || S. J. Bus || EUP || align=right | 6.9 km || 
|-id=964 bgcolor=#fefefe
| 204964 ||  || — || March 2, 1981 || Siding Spring || S. J. Bus || — || align=right data-sort-value="0.92" | 920 m || 
|-id=965 bgcolor=#fefefe
| 204965 ||  || — || September 26, 1989 || La Silla || E. W. Elst || — || align=right | 1.5 km || 
|-id=966 bgcolor=#E9E9E9
| 204966 ||  || — || August 22, 1990 || Palomar || H. E. Holt || — || align=right | 1.9 km || 
|-id=967 bgcolor=#fefefe
| 204967 ||  || — || October 3, 1991 || Tautenburg Observatory || F. Börngen, L. D. Schmadel || FLO || align=right data-sort-value="0.94" | 940 m || 
|-id=968 bgcolor=#E9E9E9
| 204968 ||  || — || October 11, 1991 || Kitt Peak || Spacewatch || — || align=right | 1.3 km || 
|-id=969 bgcolor=#d6d6d6
| 204969 ||  || — || November 8, 1991 || Kitt Peak || Spacewatch || — || align=right | 3.2 km || 
|-id=970 bgcolor=#E9E9E9
| 204970 ||  || — || February 29, 1992 || La Silla || UESAC || MIT || align=right | 3.3 km || 
|-id=971 bgcolor=#d6d6d6
| 204971 ||  || — || March 17, 1993 || La Silla || UESAC || EOS || align=right | 5.7 km || 
|-id=972 bgcolor=#fefefe
| 204972 ||  || — || August 20, 1993 || La Silla || E. W. Elst || FLO || align=right | 2.6 km || 
|-id=973 bgcolor=#fefefe
| 204973 ||  || — || September 22, 1993 || La Silla || H. Debehogne, E. W. Elst || — || align=right | 1.0 km || 
|-id=974 bgcolor=#E9E9E9
| 204974 ||  || — || October 9, 1993 || Kitt Peak || Spacewatch || NEM || align=right | 3.4 km || 
|-id=975 bgcolor=#fefefe
| 204975 ||  || — || October 11, 1993 || La Silla || E. W. Elst || — || align=right | 1.3 km || 
|-id=976 bgcolor=#d6d6d6
| 204976 ||  || — || May 1, 1994 || Kitt Peak || Spacewatch || — || align=right | 3.7 km || 
|-id=977 bgcolor=#fefefe
| 204977 ||  || — || September 28, 1994 || Kitt Peak || Spacewatch || — || align=right data-sort-value="0.88" | 880 m || 
|-id=978 bgcolor=#E9E9E9
| 204978 ||  || — || September 29, 1994 || Kitt Peak || Spacewatch || — || align=right | 1.6 km || 
|-id=979 bgcolor=#E9E9E9
| 204979 ||  || — || October 9, 1994 || Kitt Peak || Spacewatch || — || align=right | 2.0 km || 
|-id=980 bgcolor=#fefefe
| 204980 ||  || — || October 10, 1994 || Kitt Peak || Spacewatch || — || align=right | 1.5 km || 
|-id=981 bgcolor=#fefefe
| 204981 ||  || — || March 2, 1995 || Kitt Peak || Spacewatch || — || align=right data-sort-value="0.91" | 910 m || 
|-id=982 bgcolor=#E9E9E9
| 204982 ||  || — || March 23, 1995 || Kitt Peak || Spacewatch || — || align=right | 2.3 km || 
|-id=983 bgcolor=#fefefe
| 204983 ||  || — || April 5, 1995 || Kitt Peak || Spacewatch || — || align=right data-sort-value="0.94" | 940 m || 
|-id=984 bgcolor=#E9E9E9
| 204984 ||  || — || October 16, 1995 || Kitt Peak || Spacewatch || — || align=right | 1.2 km || 
|-id=985 bgcolor=#E9E9E9
| 204985 ||  || — || October 17, 1995 || Kitt Peak || Spacewatch || — || align=right | 1.0 km || 
|-id=986 bgcolor=#d6d6d6
| 204986 ||  || — || October 19, 1995 || Kitt Peak || Spacewatch || 637 || align=right | 3.5 km || 
|-id=987 bgcolor=#E9E9E9
| 204987 ||  || — || October 23, 1995 || Kitt Peak || Spacewatch || — || align=right | 1.6 km || 
|-id=988 bgcolor=#E9E9E9
| 204988 ||  || — || October 18, 1995 || Kitt Peak || Spacewatch || — || align=right | 1.3 km || 
|-id=989 bgcolor=#E9E9E9
| 204989 ||  || — || October 17, 1995 || Kitt Peak || Spacewatch || — || align=right data-sort-value="0.83" | 830 m || 
|-id=990 bgcolor=#E9E9E9
| 204990 ||  || — || December 20, 1995 || Kitt Peak || Spacewatch || — || align=right | 1.4 km || 
|-id=991 bgcolor=#E9E9E9
| 204991 ||  || — || March 11, 1996 || Kitt Peak || Spacewatch || — || align=right | 3.4 km || 
|-id=992 bgcolor=#E9E9E9
| 204992 ||  || — || March 11, 1996 || Kitt Peak || Spacewatch || PAD || align=right | 2.0 km || 
|-id=993 bgcolor=#E9E9E9
| 204993 ||  || — || March 12, 1996 || Kitt Peak || Spacewatch || — || align=right | 3.1 km || 
|-id=994 bgcolor=#fefefe
| 204994 ||  || — || September 8, 1996 || Kitt Peak || Spacewatch || NYS || align=right data-sort-value="0.92" | 920 m || 
|-id=995 bgcolor=#d6d6d6
| 204995 ||  || — || October 3, 1996 || Xinglong || SCAP || — || align=right | 7.0 km || 
|-id=996 bgcolor=#E9E9E9
| 204996 ||  || — || October 3, 1996 || Xinglong || SCAP || — || align=right | 1.6 km || 
|-id=997 bgcolor=#fefefe
| 204997 ||  || — || November 5, 1996 || Kitt Peak || Spacewatch || NYS || align=right | 1.5 km || 
|-id=998 bgcolor=#E9E9E9
| 204998 ||  || — || November 5, 1996 || Kitt Peak || Spacewatch || — || align=right | 2.0 km || 
|-id=999 bgcolor=#fefefe
| 204999 ||  || — || November 5, 1996 || Kitt Peak || Spacewatch || NYS || align=right data-sort-value="0.80" | 800 m || 
|-id=000 bgcolor=#fefefe
| 205000 ||  || — || November 5, 1996 || Kitt Peak || Spacewatch || MAS || align=right | 1.1 km || 
|}

References

External links 
 Discovery Circumstances: Numbered Minor Planets (200001)–(205000) (IAU Minor Planet Center)

0204